

416001–416100 

|-bgcolor=#fefefe
| 416001 ||  || — || January 10, 2002 || Palomar || NEAT || H || align=right | 1.1 km || 
|-id=002 bgcolor=#FFC2E0
| 416002 || 2002 BN || — || January 19, 2002 || Socorro || LINEAR || ATE || align=right data-sort-value="0.30" | 300 m || 
|-id=003 bgcolor=#E9E9E9
| 416003 ||  || — || January 21, 2002 || Socorro || LINEAR || — || align=right | 1.9 km || 
|-id=004 bgcolor=#fefefe
| 416004 ||  || — || January 9, 2002 || Socorro || LINEAR || H || align=right data-sort-value="0.90" | 900 m || 
|-id=005 bgcolor=#fefefe
| 416005 ||  || — || February 7, 2002 || Socorro || LINEAR || H || align=right data-sort-value="0.79" | 790 m || 
|-id=006 bgcolor=#fefefe
| 416006 ||  || — || February 6, 2002 || Haleakala || NEAT || — || align=right | 1.1 km || 
|-id=007 bgcolor=#E9E9E9
| 416007 ||  || — || February 6, 2002 || Socorro || LINEAR || EUN || align=right | 1.8 km || 
|-id=008 bgcolor=#E9E9E9
| 416008 ||  || — || February 6, 2002 || Socorro || LINEAR || — || align=right | 1.8 km || 
|-id=009 bgcolor=#fefefe
| 416009 ||  || — || February 10, 2002 || Socorro || LINEAR || H || align=right data-sort-value="0.72" | 720 m || 
|-id=010 bgcolor=#fefefe
| 416010 ||  || — || January 22, 2002 || Socorro || LINEAR || H || align=right data-sort-value="0.78" | 780 m || 
|-id=011 bgcolor=#fefefe
| 416011 ||  || — || January 14, 2002 || Socorro || LINEAR || — || align=right data-sort-value="0.62" | 620 m || 
|-id=012 bgcolor=#E9E9E9
| 416012 ||  || — || February 7, 2002 || Socorro || LINEAR || — || align=right | 1.8 km || 
|-id=013 bgcolor=#E9E9E9
| 416013 ||  || — || January 19, 2002 || Kitt Peak || Spacewatch || — || align=right | 1.9 km || 
|-id=014 bgcolor=#E9E9E9
| 416014 ||  || — || February 7, 2002 || Socorro || LINEAR || — || align=right | 2.5 km || 
|-id=015 bgcolor=#E9E9E9
| 416015 ||  || — || February 8, 2002 || Socorro || LINEAR || — || align=right | 2.0 km || 
|-id=016 bgcolor=#fefefe
| 416016 ||  || — || February 8, 2002 || Socorro || LINEAR || — || align=right data-sort-value="0.87" | 870 m || 
|-id=017 bgcolor=#E9E9E9
| 416017 ||  || — || January 9, 2002 || Socorro || LINEAR || — || align=right | 2.1 km || 
|-id=018 bgcolor=#E9E9E9
| 416018 ||  || — || February 8, 2002 || Socorro || LINEAR || — || align=right | 3.9 km || 
|-id=019 bgcolor=#E9E9E9
| 416019 ||  || — || February 10, 2002 || Socorro || LINEAR || — || align=right | 1.8 km || 
|-id=020 bgcolor=#E9E9E9
| 416020 ||  || — || February 5, 2002 || Palomar || NEAT || — || align=right | 2.9 km || 
|-id=021 bgcolor=#E9E9E9
| 416021 ||  || — || February 10, 2002 || Socorro || LINEAR || — || align=right | 1.9 km || 
|-id=022 bgcolor=#fefefe
| 416022 ||  || — || January 13, 2002 || Socorro || LINEAR || — || align=right data-sort-value="0.78" | 780 m || 
|-id=023 bgcolor=#E9E9E9
| 416023 ||  || — || January 22, 2002 || Anderson Mesa || NEAT || — || align=right | 1.5 km || 
|-id=024 bgcolor=#E9E9E9
| 416024 ||  || — || February 8, 2002 || Anderson Mesa || LONEOS || — || align=right | 2.0 km || 
|-id=025 bgcolor=#E9E9E9
| 416025 ||  || — || January 8, 2002 || Haleakala || NEAT || — || align=right | 1.9 km || 
|-id=026 bgcolor=#E9E9E9
| 416026 ||  || — || February 12, 2002 || Socorro || LINEAR || JUN || align=right data-sort-value="0.98" | 980 m || 
|-id=027 bgcolor=#E9E9E9
| 416027 || 2002 DY || — || February 16, 2002 || Bohyunsan || Y.-B. Jeon, B.-C. Lee || EUN || align=right | 1.2 km || 
|-id=028 bgcolor=#FA8072
| 416028 ||  || — || February 19, 2002 || Socorro || LINEAR || H || align=right data-sort-value="0.78" | 780 m || 
|-id=029 bgcolor=#fefefe
| 416029 ||  || — || February 17, 2002 || Kitt Peak || Spacewatch || H || align=right data-sort-value="0.47" | 470 m || 
|-id=030 bgcolor=#E9E9E9
| 416030 ||  || — || March 12, 2002 || Palomar || NEAT || — || align=right | 4.2 km || 
|-id=031 bgcolor=#E9E9E9
| 416031 ||  || — || March 15, 2002 || Socorro || LINEAR || — || align=right | 1.7 km || 
|-id=032 bgcolor=#FFC2E0
| 416032 ||  || — || March 15, 2002 || Socorro || LINEAR || AMOcritical || align=right data-sort-value="0.25" | 250 m || 
|-id=033 bgcolor=#E9E9E9
| 416033 ||  || — || February 14, 2002 || Kitt Peak || Spacewatch || — || align=right | 1.7 km || 
|-id=034 bgcolor=#E9E9E9
| 416034 ||  || — || February 13, 2002 || Kitt Peak || Spacewatch || — || align=right | 2.2 km || 
|-id=035 bgcolor=#E9E9E9
| 416035 ||  || — || March 13, 2002 || Socorro || LINEAR || EUN || align=right | 1.8 km || 
|-id=036 bgcolor=#fefefe
| 416036 ||  || — || February 20, 2002 || Kitt Peak || Spacewatch || — || align=right data-sort-value="0.71" | 710 m || 
|-id=037 bgcolor=#E9E9E9
| 416037 ||  || — || March 14, 2002 || Socorro || LINEAR || — || align=right | 2.9 km || 
|-id=038 bgcolor=#E9E9E9
| 416038 ||  || — || March 6, 2002 || Socorro || LINEAR || — || align=right | 2.0 km || 
|-id=039 bgcolor=#E9E9E9
| 416039 ||  || — || March 9, 2002 || Anderson Mesa || LONEOS || — || align=right | 2.2 km || 
|-id=040 bgcolor=#E9E9E9
| 416040 ||  || — || March 12, 2002 || Palomar || NEAT || — || align=right | 1.9 km || 
|-id=041 bgcolor=#E9E9E9
| 416041 ||  || — || March 13, 2002 || Palomar || NEAT || — || align=right | 1.8 km || 
|-id=042 bgcolor=#d6d6d6
| 416042 ||  || — || March 11, 2002 || Palomar || NEAT || — || align=right | 3.4 km || 
|-id=043 bgcolor=#E9E9E9
| 416043 ||  || — || March 20, 2002 || Desert Eagle || W. K. Y. Yeung ||  || align=right | 2.8 km || 
|-id=044 bgcolor=#E9E9E9
| 416044 ||  || — || March 20, 2002 || Palomar || NEAT || — || align=right | 1.8 km || 
|-id=045 bgcolor=#E9E9E9
| 416045 ||  || — || April 5, 2002 || Palomar || NEAT || — || align=right | 2.4 km || 
|-id=046 bgcolor=#E9E9E9
| 416046 ||  || — || April 14, 2002 || Haleakala || NEAT || — || align=right | 3.7 km || 
|-id=047 bgcolor=#fefefe
| 416047 ||  || — || April 4, 2002 || Socorro || LINEAR || H || align=right data-sort-value="0.90" | 900 m || 
|-id=048 bgcolor=#E9E9E9
| 416048 ||  || — || April 7, 2002 || Cerro Tololo || M. W. Buie || — || align=right | 1.9 km || 
|-id=049 bgcolor=#E9E9E9
| 416049 ||  || — || September 20, 1995 || Kitt Peak || Spacewatch || — || align=right | 1.8 km || 
|-id=050 bgcolor=#fefefe
| 416050 ||  || — || April 4, 2002 || Palomar || NEAT || — || align=right data-sort-value="0.87" | 870 m || 
|-id=051 bgcolor=#E9E9E9
| 416051 ||  || — || April 8, 2002 || Palomar || NEAT || — || align=right | 2.5 km || 
|-id=052 bgcolor=#fefefe
| 416052 ||  || — || April 9, 2002 || Palomar || NEAT || — || align=right data-sort-value="0.92" | 920 m || 
|-id=053 bgcolor=#E9E9E9
| 416053 ||  || — || April 9, 2002 || Kvistaberg || UDAS || — || align=right | 2.4 km || 
|-id=054 bgcolor=#E9E9E9
| 416054 ||  || — || April 10, 2002 || Palomar || NEAT || — || align=right | 4.6 km || 
|-id=055 bgcolor=#E9E9E9
| 416055 ||  || — || April 11, 2002 || Anderson Mesa || LONEOS || — || align=right | 1.5 km || 
|-id=056 bgcolor=#fefefe
| 416056 ||  || — || April 11, 2002 || Socorro || LINEAR || — || align=right data-sort-value="0.89" | 890 m || 
|-id=057 bgcolor=#fefefe
| 416057 ||  || — || April 13, 2002 || Palomar || NEAT || — || align=right data-sort-value="0.96" | 960 m || 
|-id=058 bgcolor=#E9E9E9
| 416058 ||  || — || April 5, 2002 || Palomar || NEAT || — || align=right | 2.3 km || 
|-id=059 bgcolor=#fefefe
| 416059 ||  || — || April 9, 2002 || Palomar || NEAT || — || align=right data-sort-value="0.65" | 650 m || 
|-id=060 bgcolor=#E9E9E9
| 416060 ||  || — || April 21, 2002 || Socorro || LINEAR || — || align=right | 4.1 km || 
|-id=061 bgcolor=#E9E9E9
| 416061 ||  || — || April 20, 2002 || Palomar || NEAT || — || align=right | 2.3 km || 
|-id=062 bgcolor=#fefefe
| 416062 ||  || — || April 22, 2002 || Palomar || NEAT || V || align=right data-sort-value="0.72" | 720 m || 
|-id=063 bgcolor=#E9E9E9
| 416063 ||  || — || May 6, 2002 || Socorro || LINEAR || — || align=right | 2.1 km || 
|-id=064 bgcolor=#E9E9E9
| 416064 ||  || — || May 13, 2002 || Palomar || NEAT || — || align=right | 3.7 km || 
|-id=065 bgcolor=#fefefe
| 416065 ||  || — || May 9, 2002 || Palomar || NEAT || — || align=right data-sort-value="0.85" | 850 m || 
|-id=066 bgcolor=#E9E9E9
| 416066 ||  || — || May 8, 2002 || Haleakala || NEAT || — || align=right | 2.4 km || 
|-id=067 bgcolor=#fefefe
| 416067 ||  || — || May 24, 2002 || Palomar || NEAT || — || align=right | 1.2 km || 
|-id=068 bgcolor=#fefefe
| 416068 ||  || — || June 15, 2002 || Kitt Peak || Spacewatch || H || align=right data-sort-value="0.71" | 710 m || 
|-id=069 bgcolor=#fefefe
| 416069 ||  || — || June 16, 2002 || Palomar || NEAT || — || align=right | 1.1 km || 
|-id=070 bgcolor=#d6d6d6
| 416070 ||  || — || June 16, 2002 || Palomar || NEAT || — || align=right | 3.7 km || 
|-id=071 bgcolor=#FFC2E0
| 416071 ||  || — || July 4, 2002 || Palomar || NEAT || AMO +1kmcritical || align=right data-sort-value="0.8" | 800 m || 
|-id=072 bgcolor=#d6d6d6
| 416072 ||  || — || July 7, 2002 || Kitt Peak || Spacewatch || — || align=right | 3.5 km || 
|-id=073 bgcolor=#d6d6d6
| 416073 ||  || — || July 8, 2002 || Palomar || NEAT || TIR || align=right | 2.8 km || 
|-id=074 bgcolor=#fefefe
| 416074 ||  || — || July 14, 2002 || Socorro || LINEAR || — || align=right | 1.5 km || 
|-id=075 bgcolor=#fefefe
| 416075 ||  || — || July 14, 2002 || Palomar || NEAT || — || align=right data-sort-value="0.80" | 800 m || 
|-id=076 bgcolor=#fefefe
| 416076 ||  || — || July 9, 2002 || Palomar || NEAT || — || align=right data-sort-value="0.76" | 760 m || 
|-id=077 bgcolor=#fefefe
| 416077 ||  || — || July 9, 2002 || Palomar || NEAT || — || align=right data-sort-value="0.67" | 670 m || 
|-id=078 bgcolor=#d6d6d6
| 416078 ||  || — || July 10, 2002 || Palomar || NEAT || — || align=right | 3.7 km || 
|-id=079 bgcolor=#fefefe
| 416079 ||  || — || July 12, 2002 || Palomar || NEAT || — || align=right data-sort-value="0.94" | 940 m || 
|-id=080 bgcolor=#d6d6d6
| 416080 ||  || — || July 12, 2002 || Palomar || NEAT || — || align=right | 4.0 km || 
|-id=081 bgcolor=#d6d6d6
| 416081 ||  || — || July 14, 2002 || Palomar || NEAT || — || align=right | 3.3 km || 
|-id=082 bgcolor=#d6d6d6
| 416082 ||  || — || July 9, 2002 || Palomar || NEAT || — || align=right | 2.3 km || 
|-id=083 bgcolor=#d6d6d6
| 416083 ||  || — || July 5, 2002 || Palomar || NEAT || — || align=right | 2.7 km || 
|-id=084 bgcolor=#d6d6d6
| 416084 ||  || — || July 5, 2002 || Palomar || NEAT || EOS || align=right | 1.8 km || 
|-id=085 bgcolor=#d6d6d6
| 416085 ||  || — || July 6, 2002 || Palomar || NEAT || — || align=right | 3.4 km || 
|-id=086 bgcolor=#d6d6d6
| 416086 ||  || — || July 8, 2002 || Palomar || NEAT || EOS || align=right | 2.3 km || 
|-id=087 bgcolor=#fefefe
| 416087 ||  || — || July 18, 2002 || Socorro || LINEAR || — || align=right | 1.1 km || 
|-id=088 bgcolor=#d6d6d6
| 416088 ||  || — || July 23, 2002 || Palomar || NEAT || — || align=right | 3.8 km || 
|-id=089 bgcolor=#d6d6d6
| 416089 ||  || — || July 16, 2002 || Palomar || NEAT || — || align=right | 4.1 km || 
|-id=090 bgcolor=#d6d6d6
| 416090 ||  || — || July 17, 2002 || Palomar || NEAT || — || align=right | 3.5 km || 
|-id=091 bgcolor=#d6d6d6
| 416091 ||  || — || July 17, 2002 || Palomar || NEAT || — || align=right | 2.9 km || 
|-id=092 bgcolor=#fefefe
| 416092 ||  || — || July 22, 2002 || Palomar || NEAT || — || align=right data-sort-value="0.80" | 800 m || 
|-id=093 bgcolor=#d6d6d6
| 416093 ||  || — || July 21, 2002 || Palomar || NEAT || EOS || align=right | 2.0 km || 
|-id=094 bgcolor=#d6d6d6
| 416094 ||  || — || August 3, 2002 || Palomar || NEAT || — || align=right | 3.1 km || 
|-id=095 bgcolor=#d6d6d6
| 416095 ||  || — || August 5, 2002 || Palomar || NEAT || — || align=right | 2.7 km || 
|-id=096 bgcolor=#d6d6d6
| 416096 ||  || — || August 5, 2002 || Palomar || NEAT || — || align=right | 3.1 km || 
|-id=097 bgcolor=#d6d6d6
| 416097 ||  || — || August 5, 2002 || Palomar || NEAT || — || align=right | 3.1 km || 
|-id=098 bgcolor=#fefefe
| 416098 ||  || — || August 5, 2002 || Palomar || NEAT || — || align=right data-sort-value="0.97" | 970 m || 
|-id=099 bgcolor=#d6d6d6
| 416099 ||  || — || August 6, 2002 || Palomar || NEAT || — || align=right | 2.8 km || 
|-id=100 bgcolor=#fefefe
| 416100 ||  || — || August 6, 2002 || Palomar || NEAT || critical || align=right data-sort-value="0.78" | 780 m || 
|}

416101–416200 

|-bgcolor=#d6d6d6
| 416101 ||  || — || August 8, 2002 || Palomar || NEAT || — || align=right | 4.0 km || 
|-id=102 bgcolor=#E9E9E9
| 416102 ||  || — || August 5, 2002 || Palomar || NEAT || — || align=right | 3.5 km || 
|-id=103 bgcolor=#fefefe
| 416103 ||  || — || August 6, 2002 || Palomar || NEAT || — || align=right data-sort-value="0.71" | 710 m || 
|-id=104 bgcolor=#d6d6d6
| 416104 ||  || — || August 14, 2002 || Socorro || LINEAR || — || align=right | 5.7 km || 
|-id=105 bgcolor=#fefefe
| 416105 ||  || — || August 14, 2002 || Pla D'Arguines || R. Ferrando || — || align=right | 1.0 km || 
|-id=106 bgcolor=#d6d6d6
| 416106 ||  || — || August 13, 2002 || Kitt Peak || Spacewatch || — || align=right | 2.0 km || 
|-id=107 bgcolor=#fefefe
| 416107 ||  || — || August 8, 2002 || Palomar || S. F. Hönig || MAS || align=right data-sort-value="0.63" | 630 m || 
|-id=108 bgcolor=#d6d6d6
| 416108 ||  || — || August 8, 2002 || Palomar || S. F. Hönig || — || align=right | 3.0 km || 
|-id=109 bgcolor=#d6d6d6
| 416109 ||  || — || August 8, 2002 || Palomar || NEAT || — || align=right | 4.7 km || 
|-id=110 bgcolor=#fefefe
| 416110 ||  || — || August 8, 2002 || Palomar || NEAT || — || align=right data-sort-value="0.80" | 800 m || 
|-id=111 bgcolor=#d6d6d6
| 416111 ||  || — || August 7, 2002 || Palomar || NEAT || EOS || align=right | 2.2 km || 
|-id=112 bgcolor=#d6d6d6
| 416112 ||  || — || August 11, 2002 || Palomar || NEAT || — || align=right | 3.9 km || 
|-id=113 bgcolor=#fefefe
| 416113 ||  || — || August 14, 2002 || Palomar || NEAT || MAScritical || align=right data-sort-value="0.65" | 650 m || 
|-id=114 bgcolor=#d6d6d6
| 416114 ||  || — || August 15, 2002 || Palomar || NEAT || EOS || align=right | 1.8 km || 
|-id=115 bgcolor=#fefefe
| 416115 ||  || — || August 8, 2002 || Palomar || NEAT || NYS || align=right data-sort-value="0.48" | 480 m || 
|-id=116 bgcolor=#fefefe
| 416116 ||  || — || August 8, 2002 || Palomar || NEAT || — || align=right data-sort-value="0.83" | 830 m || 
|-id=117 bgcolor=#fefefe
| 416117 ||  || — || August 16, 2002 || Haleakala || NEAT || — || align=right data-sort-value="0.83" | 830 m || 
|-id=118 bgcolor=#fefefe
| 416118 ||  || — || August 29, 2002 || Palomar || NEAT || — || align=right data-sort-value="0.79" | 790 m || 
|-id=119 bgcolor=#d6d6d6
| 416119 ||  || — || August 29, 2002 || Palomar || NEAT || THB || align=right | 3.2 km || 
|-id=120 bgcolor=#d6d6d6
| 416120 ||  || — || August 30, 2002 || Kitt Peak || Spacewatch || — || align=right | 2.7 km || 
|-id=121 bgcolor=#fefefe
| 416121 ||  || — || August 17, 2002 || Palomar || A. Lowe || — || align=right data-sort-value="0.97" | 970 m || 
|-id=122 bgcolor=#d6d6d6
| 416122 ||  || — || August 19, 2002 || Palomar || NEAT || — || align=right | 2.8 km || 
|-id=123 bgcolor=#fefefe
| 416123 ||  || — || August 18, 2002 || Palomar || NEAT || — || align=right data-sort-value="0.82" | 820 m || 
|-id=124 bgcolor=#fefefe
| 416124 ||  || — || August 27, 2002 || Palomar || NEAT || — || align=right | 1.0 km || 
|-id=125 bgcolor=#fefefe
| 416125 ||  || — || August 19, 2002 || Palomar || NEAT || — || align=right data-sort-value="0.83" | 830 m || 
|-id=126 bgcolor=#fefefe
| 416126 ||  || — || August 27, 2002 || Palomar || NEAT || — || align=right data-sort-value="0.82" | 820 m || 
|-id=127 bgcolor=#d6d6d6
| 416127 ||  || — || August 28, 2002 || Palomar || NEAT || LIX || align=right | 4.0 km || 
|-id=128 bgcolor=#d6d6d6
| 416128 ||  || — || August 18, 2002 || Palomar || NEAT || THM || align=right | 2.1 km || 
|-id=129 bgcolor=#d6d6d6
| 416129 ||  || — || August 16, 2002 || Palomar || NEAT || HYG || align=right | 2.5 km || 
|-id=130 bgcolor=#fefefe
| 416130 ||  || — || August 30, 2002 || Palomar || NEAT || — || align=right data-sort-value="0.68" | 680 m || 
|-id=131 bgcolor=#d6d6d6
| 416131 ||  || — || August 16, 2002 || Palomar || NEAT || EOS || align=right | 2.4 km || 
|-id=132 bgcolor=#fefefe
| 416132 ||  || — || August 29, 2002 || Palomar || NEAT || NYS || align=right data-sort-value="0.72" | 720 m || 
|-id=133 bgcolor=#d6d6d6
| 416133 ||  || — || August 19, 2002 || Palomar || NEAT || EMA || align=right | 3.2 km || 
|-id=134 bgcolor=#d6d6d6
| 416134 ||  || — || August 17, 2002 || Palomar || NEAT || — || align=right | 3.2 km || 
|-id=135 bgcolor=#d6d6d6
| 416135 ||  || — || August 28, 2002 || Palomar || NEAT || HYG || align=right | 2.4 km || 
|-id=136 bgcolor=#d6d6d6
| 416136 ||  || — || August 18, 2002 || Palomar || NEAT || — || align=right | 3.4 km || 
|-id=137 bgcolor=#fefefe
| 416137 ||  || — || August 16, 2002 || Palomar || NEAT || — || align=right data-sort-value="0.83" | 830 m || 
|-id=138 bgcolor=#d6d6d6
| 416138 ||  || — || August 26, 2002 || Palomar || NEAT || — || align=right | 2.6 km || 
|-id=139 bgcolor=#d6d6d6
| 416139 ||  || — || August 28, 2002 || Palomar || NEAT || THB || align=right | 3.2 km || 
|-id=140 bgcolor=#d6d6d6
| 416140 ||  || — || August 18, 2002 || Palomar || NEAT || THM || align=right | 2.2 km || 
|-id=141 bgcolor=#d6d6d6
| 416141 ||  || — || August 16, 2002 || Palomar || NEAT || — || align=right | 2.7 km || 
|-id=142 bgcolor=#d6d6d6
| 416142 ||  || — || August 30, 2002 || Palomar || NEAT || — || align=right | 3.0 km || 
|-id=143 bgcolor=#fefefe
| 416143 ||  || — || August 30, 2002 || Palomar || NEAT || NYS || align=right data-sort-value="0.58" | 580 m || 
|-id=144 bgcolor=#d6d6d6
| 416144 ||  || — || August 30, 2002 || Palomar || NEAT || — || align=right | 3.4 km || 
|-id=145 bgcolor=#fefefe
| 416145 ||  || — || August 27, 2002 || Palomar || NEAT || V || align=right data-sort-value="0.64" | 640 m || 
|-id=146 bgcolor=#d6d6d6
| 416146 ||  || — || August 29, 2002 || Palomar || NEAT || — || align=right | 2.8 km || 
|-id=147 bgcolor=#fefefe
| 416147 ||  || — || August 30, 2002 || Palomar || NEAT || — || align=right data-sort-value="0.74" | 740 m || 
|-id=148 bgcolor=#d6d6d6
| 416148 ||  || — || August 28, 2002 || Palomar || NEAT || HYG || align=right | 2.8 km || 
|-id=149 bgcolor=#d6d6d6
| 416149 ||  || — || August 30, 2002 || Palomar || NEAT || — || align=right | 2.7 km || 
|-id=150 bgcolor=#d6d6d6
| 416150 ||  || — || September 4, 2002 || Anderson Mesa || LONEOS || — || align=right | 3.8 km || 
|-id=151 bgcolor=#FFC2E0
| 416151 ||  || — || September 3, 2002 || Campo Imperatore || CINEOS || APO || align=right data-sort-value="0.27" | 270 m || 
|-id=152 bgcolor=#fefefe
| 416152 ||  || — || September 4, 2002 || Anderson Mesa || LONEOS || — || align=right | 1.0 km || 
|-id=153 bgcolor=#fefefe
| 416153 ||  || — || September 5, 2002 || Socorro || LINEAR || — || align=right data-sort-value="0.90" | 900 m || 
|-id=154 bgcolor=#fefefe
| 416154 ||  || — || September 6, 2002 || Socorro || LINEAR || — || align=right | 1.3 km || 
|-id=155 bgcolor=#d6d6d6
| 416155 ||  || — || September 1, 2002 || Palomar || NEAT || THB || align=right | 2.7 km || 
|-id=156 bgcolor=#d6d6d6
| 416156 ||  || — || September 11, 2002 || Palomar || NEAT || — || align=right | 3.0 km || 
|-id=157 bgcolor=#fefefe
| 416157 ||  || — || September 11, 2002 || Palomar || NEAT || — || align=right data-sort-value="0.86" | 860 m || 
|-id=158 bgcolor=#fefefe
| 416158 ||  || — || September 13, 2002 || Palomar || NEAT || V || align=right data-sort-value="0.69" | 690 m || 
|-id=159 bgcolor=#fefefe
| 416159 ||  || — || September 13, 2002 || Palomar || NEAT || — || align=right data-sort-value="0.89" | 890 m || 
|-id=160 bgcolor=#fefefe
| 416160 ||  || — || September 12, 2002 || Palomar || NEAT || — || align=right data-sort-value="0.92" | 920 m || 
|-id=161 bgcolor=#fefefe
| 416161 ||  || — || September 14, 2002 || Palomar || NEAT || — || align=right data-sort-value="0.75" | 750 m || 
|-id=162 bgcolor=#d6d6d6
| 416162 ||  || — || September 14, 2002 || Palomar || NEAT || LIX || align=right | 3.6 km || 
|-id=163 bgcolor=#fefefe
| 416163 ||  || — || September 14, 2002 || Haleakala || NEAT || — || align=right data-sort-value="0.90" | 900 m || 
|-id=164 bgcolor=#fefefe
| 416164 ||  || — || September 14, 2002 || Palomar || R. Matson || — || align=right data-sort-value="0.65" | 650 m || 
|-id=165 bgcolor=#d6d6d6
| 416165 ||  || — || September 14, 2002 || Palomar || R. Matson || — || align=right | 2.9 km || 
|-id=166 bgcolor=#d6d6d6
| 416166 ||  || — || September 8, 2002 || Haleakala || NEAT ||  || align=right | 3.4 km || 
|-id=167 bgcolor=#fefefe
| 416167 ||  || — || September 11, 2002 || Palomar || NEAT || — || align=right data-sort-value="0.75" | 750 m || 
|-id=168 bgcolor=#d6d6d6
| 416168 ||  || — || September 13, 2002 || Palomar || NEAT || — || align=right | 4.2 km || 
|-id=169 bgcolor=#d6d6d6
| 416169 ||  || — || September 13, 2002 || Palomar || NEAT || — || align=right | 2.5 km || 
|-id=170 bgcolor=#d6d6d6
| 416170 ||  || — || September 13, 2002 || Palomar || NEAT || EOS || align=right | 2.5 km || 
|-id=171 bgcolor=#d6d6d6
| 416171 ||  || — || September 3, 2002 || Palomar || NEAT || EOS || align=right | 2.4 km || 
|-id=172 bgcolor=#d6d6d6
| 416172 ||  || — || September 14, 2002 || Palomar || NEAT || — || align=right | 2.6 km || 
|-id=173 bgcolor=#d6d6d6
| 416173 ||  || — || September 4, 2002 || Palomar || NEAT || — || align=right | 4.3 km || 
|-id=174 bgcolor=#fefefe
| 416174 ||  || — || September 27, 2002 || Palomar || NEAT || — || align=right data-sort-value="0.86" | 860 m || 
|-id=175 bgcolor=#d6d6d6
| 416175 ||  || — || September 27, 2002 || Palomar || NEAT || — || align=right | 4.4 km || 
|-id=176 bgcolor=#d6d6d6
| 416176 ||  || — || September 27, 2002 || Palomar || NEAT || TIR || align=right | 2.9 km || 
|-id=177 bgcolor=#fefefe
| 416177 ||  || — || September 27, 2002 || Palomar || NEAT || MAScritical || align=right data-sort-value="0.78" | 780 m || 
|-id=178 bgcolor=#fefefe
| 416178 ||  || — || September 27, 2002 || Palomar || NEAT || — || align=right data-sort-value="0.85" | 850 m || 
|-id=179 bgcolor=#d6d6d6
| 416179 ||  || — || September 14, 2002 || Anderson Mesa || LONEOS || — || align=right | 4.0 km || 
|-id=180 bgcolor=#d6d6d6
| 416180 ||  || — || September 30, 2002 || Palomar || NEAT || — || align=right | 3.7 km || 
|-id=181 bgcolor=#d6d6d6
| 416181 ||  || — || September 16, 2002 || Palomar || NEAT || EOS || align=right | 2.0 km || 
|-id=182 bgcolor=#d6d6d6
| 416182 ||  || — || September 17, 2002 || Palomar || NEAT || HYG || align=right | 2.4 km || 
|-id=183 bgcolor=#d6d6d6
| 416183 ||  || — || September 26, 2002 || Palomar || NEAT || LIX || align=right | 2.2 km || 
|-id=184 bgcolor=#fefefe
| 416184 ||  || — || September 16, 2002 || Palomar || NEAT || — || align=right data-sort-value="0.77" | 770 m || 
|-id=185 bgcolor=#d6d6d6
| 416185 ||  || — || August 14, 2002 || Socorro || LINEAR || — || align=right | 4.7 km || 
|-id=186 bgcolor=#FFC2E0
| 416186 ||  || — || October 5, 2002 || Socorro || LINEAR || AMO || align=right data-sort-value="0.49" | 490 m || 
|-id=187 bgcolor=#FA8072
| 416187 ||  || — || October 5, 2002 || Socorro || LINEAR || — || align=right | 2.8 km || 
|-id=188 bgcolor=#d6d6d6
| 416188 ||  || — || October 2, 2002 || Campo Imperatore || CINEOS || — || align=right | 3.5 km || 
|-id=189 bgcolor=#d6d6d6
| 416189 ||  || — || October 4, 2002 || Socorro || LINEAR || LIX || align=right | 3.1 km || 
|-id=190 bgcolor=#fefefe
| 416190 ||  || — || October 4, 2002 || Socorro || LINEAR || — || align=right | 1.2 km || 
|-id=191 bgcolor=#d6d6d6
| 416191 ||  || — || October 4, 2002 || Palomar || NEAT || — || align=right | 3.1 km || 
|-id=192 bgcolor=#fefefe
| 416192 ||  || — || October 4, 2002 || Socorro || LINEAR || — || align=right data-sort-value="0.76" | 760 m || 
|-id=193 bgcolor=#d6d6d6
| 416193 ||  || — || October 4, 2002 || Palomar || NEAT || — || align=right | 3.9 km || 
|-id=194 bgcolor=#fefefe
| 416194 ||  || — || October 5, 2002 || Palomar || NEAT || — || align=right data-sort-value="0.81" | 810 m || 
|-id=195 bgcolor=#FFC2E0
| 416195 ||  || — || October 12, 2002 || Socorro || LINEAR || APOPHA || align=right data-sort-value="0.48" | 480 m || 
|-id=196 bgcolor=#d6d6d6
| 416196 ||  || — || October 6, 2002 || Anderson Mesa || LONEOS || — || align=right | 3.1 km || 
|-id=197 bgcolor=#d6d6d6
| 416197 ||  || — || October 4, 2002 || Socorro || LINEAR || — || align=right | 3.5 km || 
|-id=198 bgcolor=#d6d6d6
| 416198 ||  || — || October 11, 2002 || Socorro || LINEAR || — || align=right | 4.6 km || 
|-id=199 bgcolor=#d6d6d6
| 416199 ||  || — || October 4, 2002 || Apache Point || SDSS || — || align=right | 3.9 km || 
|-id=200 bgcolor=#d6d6d6
| 416200 ||  || — || October 4, 2002 || Apache Point || SDSS || — || align=right | 3.4 km || 
|}

416201–416300 

|-bgcolor=#d6d6d6
| 416201 ||  || — || October 4, 2002 || Apache Point || SDSS || — || align=right | 4.1 km || 
|-id=202 bgcolor=#d6d6d6
| 416202 ||  || — || September 14, 2002 || Palomar || NEAT || — || align=right | 2.9 km || 
|-id=203 bgcolor=#d6d6d6
| 416203 ||  || — || October 5, 2002 || Apache Point || SDSS || — || align=right | 2.8 km || 
|-id=204 bgcolor=#fefefe
| 416204 ||  || — || October 5, 2002 || Apache Point || SDSS || — || align=right data-sort-value="0.68" | 680 m || 
|-id=205 bgcolor=#d6d6d6
| 416205 ||  || — || October 5, 2002 || Apache Point || SDSS || THM || align=right | 2.2 km || 
|-id=206 bgcolor=#d6d6d6
| 416206 ||  || — || October 5, 2002 || Apache Point || SDSS || — || align=right | 2.9 km || 
|-id=207 bgcolor=#d6d6d6
| 416207 ||  || — || October 10, 2002 || Apache Point || SDSS || — || align=right | 2.8 km || 
|-id=208 bgcolor=#fefefe
| 416208 ||  || — || October 10, 2002 || Apache Point || SDSS || — || align=right data-sort-value="0.65" | 650 m || 
|-id=209 bgcolor=#fefefe
| 416209 ||  || — || October 1, 2002 || Socorro || LINEAR || — || align=right data-sort-value="0.90" | 900 m || 
|-id=210 bgcolor=#d6d6d6
| 416210 ||  || — || October 28, 2002 || Palomar || NEAT || — || align=right | 3.4 km || 
|-id=211 bgcolor=#FA8072
| 416211 ||  || — || October 31, 2002 || Socorro || LINEAR || — || align=right | 2.2 km || 
|-id=212 bgcolor=#d6d6d6
| 416212 ||  || — || October 29, 2002 || Apache Point || SDSS || — || align=right | 3.0 km || 
|-id=213 bgcolor=#d6d6d6
| 416213 ||  || — || October 30, 2002 || Apache Point || SDSS || VER || align=right | 2.9 km || 
|-id=214 bgcolor=#fefefe
| 416214 ||  || — || November 1, 2002 || Palomar || NEAT || — || align=right | 1.0 km || 
|-id=215 bgcolor=#d6d6d6
| 416215 ||  || — || October 18, 2002 || Palomar || NEAT || — || align=right | 4.0 km || 
|-id=216 bgcolor=#fefefe
| 416216 ||  || — || November 11, 2002 || Kitt Peak || Spacewatch || — || align=right data-sort-value="0.96" | 960 m || 
|-id=217 bgcolor=#FFC2E0
| 416217 ||  || — || November 14, 2002 || Palomar || NEAT || AMO || align=right data-sort-value="0.28" | 280 m || 
|-id=218 bgcolor=#d6d6d6
| 416218 ||  || — || November 16, 2002 || Palomar || NEAT || — || align=right | 3.8 km || 
|-id=219 bgcolor=#d6d6d6
| 416219 ||  || — || November 24, 2002 || Palomar || NEAT || — || align=right | 2.7 km || 
|-id=220 bgcolor=#fefefe
| 416220 ||  || — || November 24, 2002 || Palomar || NEAT || — || align=right data-sort-value="0.87" | 870 m || 
|-id=221 bgcolor=#E9E9E9
| 416221 ||  || — || November 24, 2002 || Palomar || NEAT || — || align=right | 1.0 km || 
|-id=222 bgcolor=#d6d6d6
| 416222 ||  || — || October 12, 2002 || Socorro || LINEAR || — || align=right | 3.4 km || 
|-id=223 bgcolor=#FA8072
| 416223 ||  || — || December 13, 2002 || Kitt Peak || Spacewatch || — || align=right data-sort-value="0.54" | 540 m || 
|-id=224 bgcolor=#FFC2E0
| 416224 ||  || — || December 5, 2002 || Socorro || LINEAR || AMO +1km || align=right data-sort-value="0.90" | 900 m || 
|-id=225 bgcolor=#C2FFFF
| 416225 ||  || — || December 10, 2002 || Palomar || NEAT || L5 || align=right | 10 km || 
|-id=226 bgcolor=#E9E9E9
| 416226 ||  || — || December 31, 2002 || Socorro || LINEAR || — || align=right | 1.4 km || 
|-id=227 bgcolor=#E9E9E9
| 416227 ||  || — || January 2, 2003 || Socorro || LINEAR || — || align=right | 2.1 km || 
|-id=228 bgcolor=#d6d6d6
| 416228 ||  || — || January 5, 2003 || Socorro || LINEAR || Tj (2.99) || align=right | 3.8 km || 
|-id=229 bgcolor=#d6d6d6
| 416229 ||  || — || January 5, 2003 || Socorro || LINEAR || 7:4* || align=right | 3.3 km || 
|-id=230 bgcolor=#E9E9E9
| 416230 ||  || — || January 9, 2003 || Socorro || LINEAR || — || align=right | 1.5 km || 
|-id=231 bgcolor=#FFC2E0
| 416231 ||  || — || January 11, 2003 || Socorro || LINEAR || AMO || align=right data-sort-value="0.70" | 700 m || 
|-id=232 bgcolor=#E9E9E9
| 416232 ||  || — || January 11, 2003 || Kitt Peak || Spacewatch || EUN || align=right | 1.1 km || 
|-id=233 bgcolor=#d6d6d6
| 416233 ||  || — || January 5, 2003 || Socorro || LINEAR || 7:4 || align=right | 4.9 km || 
|-id=234 bgcolor=#E9E9E9
| 416234 ||  || — || January 24, 2003 || Palomar || NEAT || — || align=right | 1.5 km || 
|-id=235 bgcolor=#E9E9E9
| 416235 ||  || — || January 27, 2003 || Anderson Mesa || LONEOS || — || align=right | 1.7 km || 
|-id=236 bgcolor=#E9E9E9
| 416236 ||  || — || January 26, 2003 || Haleakala || NEAT || — || align=right | 1.5 km || 
|-id=237 bgcolor=#E9E9E9
| 416237 ||  || — || January 25, 2003 || Palomar || NEAT || — || align=right | 1.9 km || 
|-id=238 bgcolor=#E9E9E9
| 416238 ||  || — || January 25, 2003 || Palomar || NEAT || — || align=right | 1.4 km || 
|-id=239 bgcolor=#E9E9E9
| 416239 ||  || — || January 27, 2003 || Haleakala || NEAT || — || align=right | 1.8 km || 
|-id=240 bgcolor=#E9E9E9
| 416240 ||  || — || January 28, 2003 || Palomar || NEAT || — || align=right data-sort-value="0.86" | 860 m || 
|-id=241 bgcolor=#E9E9E9
| 416241 ||  || — || January 30, 2003 || Anderson Mesa || LONEOS || (5) || align=right data-sort-value="0.87" | 870 m || 
|-id=242 bgcolor=#E9E9E9
| 416242 ||  || — || January 30, 2003 || Haleakala || NEAT || (5) || align=right data-sort-value="0.96" | 960 m || 
|-id=243 bgcolor=#E9E9E9
| 416243 ||  || — || January 31, 2003 || Socorro || LINEAR || — || align=right | 1.5 km || 
|-id=244 bgcolor=#E9E9E9
| 416244 ||  || — || January 26, 2003 || Kitt Peak || Spacewatch || (5) || align=right data-sort-value="0.70" | 700 m || 
|-id=245 bgcolor=#E9E9E9
| 416245 ||  || — || January 5, 2003 || Socorro || LINEAR || — || align=right | 1.8 km || 
|-id=246 bgcolor=#E9E9E9
| 416246 ||  || — || February 1, 2003 || Socorro || LINEAR || — || align=right | 1.2 km || 
|-id=247 bgcolor=#E9E9E9
| 416247 ||  || — || February 1, 2003 || Socorro || LINEAR || — || align=right | 1.7 km || 
|-id=248 bgcolor=#E9E9E9
| 416248 ||  || — || February 9, 2003 || Palomar || NEAT || — || align=right | 1.7 km || 
|-id=249 bgcolor=#E9E9E9
| 416249 ||  || — || February 22, 2003 || Kitt Peak || Spacewatch || — || align=right | 1.8 km || 
|-id=250 bgcolor=#E9E9E9
| 416250 ||  || — || February 28, 2003 || Haleakala || NEAT || — || align=right | 2.0 km || 
|-id=251 bgcolor=#E9E9E9
| 416251 || 2003 EQ || — || March 5, 2003 || Kleť || M. Tichý, M. Kočer || — || align=right | 1.2 km || 
|-id=252 bgcolor=#E9E9E9
| 416252 Manuelherrera || 2003 ES ||  || March 5, 2003 || Sierra Nevada || J. L. Ortiz || — || align=right | 1.9 km || 
|-id=253 bgcolor=#E9E9E9
| 416253 ||  || — || March 6, 2003 || Socorro || LINEAR || — || align=right | 2.3 km || 
|-id=254 bgcolor=#E9E9E9
| 416254 ||  || — || March 7, 2003 || Socorro || LINEAR || — || align=right | 1.2 km || 
|-id=255 bgcolor=#E9E9E9
| 416255 ||  || — || March 7, 2003 || Anderson Mesa || LONEOS || — || align=right | 1.9 km || 
|-id=256 bgcolor=#E9E9E9
| 416256 ||  || — || March 8, 2003 || Kitt Peak || Spacewatch || — || align=right | 2.2 km || 
|-id=257 bgcolor=#E9E9E9
| 416257 ||  || — || March 7, 2003 || Anderson Mesa || LONEOS || RAF || align=right | 1.1 km || 
|-id=258 bgcolor=#E9E9E9
| 416258 ||  || — || March 9, 2003 || Anderson Mesa || LONEOS || — || align=right | 2.6 km || 
|-id=259 bgcolor=#E9E9E9
| 416259 ||  || — || March 8, 2003 || Anderson Mesa || LONEOS || — || align=right | 2.0 km || 
|-id=260 bgcolor=#E9E9E9
| 416260 ||  || — || March 23, 2003 || Saint-Sulpice || B. Christophe || EUN || align=right | 1.4 km || 
|-id=261 bgcolor=#FA8072
| 416261 ||  || — || March 27, 2003 || Socorro || LINEAR || — || align=right data-sort-value="0.98" | 980 m || 
|-id=262 bgcolor=#E9E9E9
| 416262 ||  || — || March 23, 2003 || Palomar || NEAT || — || align=right | 2.1 km || 
|-id=263 bgcolor=#E9E9E9
| 416263 ||  || — || March 24, 2003 || Kitt Peak || Spacewatch || — || align=right | 2.4 km || 
|-id=264 bgcolor=#E9E9E9
| 416264 ||  || — || March 25, 2003 || Palomar || NEAT || — || align=right | 1.8 km || 
|-id=265 bgcolor=#E9E9E9
| 416265 ||  || — || March 25, 2003 || Palomar || NEAT || — || align=right | 1.4 km || 
|-id=266 bgcolor=#E9E9E9
| 416266 ||  || — || March 26, 2003 || Kitt Peak || Spacewatch || — || align=right | 1.8 km || 
|-id=267 bgcolor=#E9E9E9
| 416267 ||  || — || March 29, 2003 || Anderson Mesa || LONEOS || JUN || align=right | 1.4 km || 
|-id=268 bgcolor=#E9E9E9
| 416268 ||  || — || March 30, 2003 || Kitt Peak || Spacewatch || EUN || align=right | 1.1 km || 
|-id=269 bgcolor=#E9E9E9
| 416269 ||  || — || March 30, 2003 || Socorro || LINEAR || — || align=right | 1.1 km || 
|-id=270 bgcolor=#fefefe
| 416270 ||  || — || March 26, 2003 || Anderson Mesa || LONEOS || — || align=right data-sort-value="0.86" | 860 m || 
|-id=271 bgcolor=#d6d6d6
| 416271 ||  || — || March 31, 2003 || Kitt Peak || Spacewatch || — || align=right | 2.6 km || 
|-id=272 bgcolor=#E9E9E9
| 416272 ||  || — || April 1, 2003 || Socorro || LINEAR || — || align=right | 1.1 km || 
|-id=273 bgcolor=#E9E9E9
| 416273 Glennsnyder ||  ||  || April 8, 2003 || Wrightwood || J. W. Young || — || align=right | 1.7 km || 
|-id=274 bgcolor=#E9E9E9
| 416274 ||  || — || March 26, 2003 || Kitt Peak || Spacewatch || — || align=right | 1.5 km || 
|-id=275 bgcolor=#E9E9E9
| 416275 ||  || — || April 26, 2003 || Haleakala || NEAT || — || align=right | 2.4 km || 
|-id=276 bgcolor=#fefefe
| 416276 ||  || — || April 9, 2003 || Kitt Peak || Spacewatch || — || align=right data-sort-value="0.77" | 770 m || 
|-id=277 bgcolor=#fefefe
| 416277 ||  || — || April 26, 2003 || Apache Point || SDSS || H || align=right data-sort-value="0.78" | 780 m || 
|-id=278 bgcolor=#E9E9E9
| 416278 ||  || — || May 20, 2003 || Anderson Mesa || LONEOS || — || align=right | 1.9 km || 
|-id=279 bgcolor=#E9E9E9
| 416279 ||  || — || May 23, 2003 || Kitt Peak || Spacewatch || (5) || align=right data-sort-value="0.98" | 980 m || 
|-id=280 bgcolor=#d6d6d6
| 416280 ||  || — || May 22, 2003 || Kitt Peak || Spacewatch || — || align=right | 3.3 km || 
|-id=281 bgcolor=#fefefe
| 416281 ||  || — || May 20, 2003 || Anderson Mesa || LONEOS || — || align=right data-sort-value="0.81" | 810 m || 
|-id=282 bgcolor=#FA8072
| 416282 ||  || — || May 26, 2003 || Kitt Peak || Spacewatch || — || align=right data-sort-value="0.64" | 640 m || 
|-id=283 bgcolor=#FFC2E0
| 416283 ||  || — || June 21, 2003 || Socorro || LINEAR || APOcritical || align=right data-sort-value="0.18" | 180 m || 
|-id=284 bgcolor=#fefefe
| 416284 ||  || — || July 28, 2003 || Campo Imperatore || CINEOS || — || align=right data-sort-value="0.85" | 850 m || 
|-id=285 bgcolor=#E9E9E9
| 416285 ||  || — || July 24, 2003 || Palomar || NEAT || — || align=right | 2.9 km || 
|-id=286 bgcolor=#FA8072
| 416286 ||  || — || August 9, 2003 || Haleakala || NEAT || unusual || align=right | 1.9 km || 
|-id=287 bgcolor=#fefefe
| 416287 ||  || — || August 22, 2003 || Palomar || NEAT || — || align=right | 1.1 km || 
|-id=288 bgcolor=#d6d6d6
| 416288 ||  || — || August 25, 2003 || Palomar || NEAT || — || align=right | 2.9 km || 
|-id=289 bgcolor=#fefefe
| 416289 ||  || — || July 8, 2003 || Kitt Peak || Spacewatch || H || align=right | 1.0 km || 
|-id=290 bgcolor=#fefefe
| 416290 ||  || — || August 24, 2003 || Socorro || LINEAR || — || align=right | 1.9 km || 
|-id=291 bgcolor=#d6d6d6
| 416291 ||  || — || August 25, 2003 || Socorro || LINEAR || — || align=right | 3.0 km || 
|-id=292 bgcolor=#fefefe
| 416292 ||  || — || August 21, 2003 || Needville || Needville Obs. || V || align=right data-sort-value="0.66" | 660 m || 
|-id=293 bgcolor=#d6d6d6
| 416293 ||  || — || August 30, 2003 || Kitt Peak || Spacewatch || — || align=right | 3.2 km || 
|-id=294 bgcolor=#FA8072
| 416294 ||  || — || August 31, 2003 || Haleakala || NEAT || — || align=right | 1.1 km || 
|-id=295 bgcolor=#fefefe
| 416295 ||  || — || July 25, 2003 || Palomar || NEAT || — || align=right | 1.1 km || 
|-id=296 bgcolor=#FA8072
| 416296 ||  || — || September 2, 2003 || Haleakala || NEAT || — || align=right data-sort-value="0.80" | 800 m || 
|-id=297 bgcolor=#fefefe
| 416297 ||  || — || September 1, 2003 || Socorro || LINEAR || — || align=right data-sort-value="0.81" | 810 m || 
|-id=298 bgcolor=#fefefe
| 416298 ||  || — || September 15, 2003 || Haleakala || NEAT || — || align=right | 1.8 km || 
|-id=299 bgcolor=#fefefe
| 416299 ||  || — || September 15, 2003 || Anderson Mesa || LONEOS || — || align=right data-sort-value="0.70" | 700 m || 
|-id=300 bgcolor=#fefefe
| 416300 ||  || — || September 15, 2003 || Haleakala || NEAT || — || align=right data-sort-value="0.75" | 750 m || 
|}

416301–416400 

|-bgcolor=#FA8072
| 416301 ||  || — || September 7, 2003 || Socorro || LINEAR || — || align=right | 1.0 km || 
|-id=302 bgcolor=#fefefe
| 416302 ||  || — || September 16, 2003 || Anderson Mesa || LONEOS || — || align=right data-sort-value="0.82" | 820 m || 
|-id=303 bgcolor=#fefefe
| 416303 ||  || — || September 16, 2003 || Kitt Peak || Spacewatch || — || align=right data-sort-value="0.83" | 830 m || 
|-id=304 bgcolor=#fefefe
| 416304 ||  || — || September 16, 2003 || Kitt Peak || Spacewatch || — || align=right data-sort-value="0.61" | 610 m || 
|-id=305 bgcolor=#fefefe
| 416305 ||  || — || September 16, 2003 || Kitt Peak || Spacewatch || — || align=right data-sort-value="0.71" | 710 m || 
|-id=306 bgcolor=#d6d6d6
| 416306 ||  || — || September 18, 2003 || Palomar || NEAT || — || align=right | 3.5 km || 
|-id=307 bgcolor=#fefefe
| 416307 ||  || — || September 16, 2003 || Palomar || NEAT || — || align=right | 1.0 km || 
|-id=308 bgcolor=#fefefe
| 416308 ||  || — || September 17, 2003 || Palomar || NEAT || — || align=right data-sort-value="0.95" | 950 m || 
|-id=309 bgcolor=#fefefe
| 416309 ||  || — || September 16, 2003 || Anderson Mesa || LONEOS || — || align=right data-sort-value="0.86" | 860 m || 
|-id=310 bgcolor=#d6d6d6
| 416310 ||  || — || September 18, 2003 || Palomar || NEAT || — || align=right | 2.9 km || 
|-id=311 bgcolor=#fefefe
| 416311 ||  || — || September 18, 2003 || Palomar || NEAT || NYS || align=right data-sort-value="0.74" | 740 m || 
|-id=312 bgcolor=#fefefe
| 416312 ||  || — || September 16, 2003 || Anderson Mesa || LONEOS || — || align=right | 2.0 km || 
|-id=313 bgcolor=#fefefe
| 416313 ||  || — || September 19, 2003 || Kitt Peak || Spacewatch || — || align=right data-sort-value="0.85" | 850 m || 
|-id=314 bgcolor=#d6d6d6
| 416314 ||  || — || September 16, 2003 || Palomar || NEAT || — || align=right | 3.9 km || 
|-id=315 bgcolor=#d6d6d6
| 416315 ||  || — || September 16, 2003 || Kitt Peak || Spacewatch || — || align=right | 2.4 km || 
|-id=316 bgcolor=#fefefe
| 416316 ||  || — || September 18, 2003 || Palomar || NEAT || H || align=right data-sort-value="0.78" | 780 m || 
|-id=317 bgcolor=#fefefe
| 416317 ||  || — || September 20, 2003 || Haleakala || NEAT || — || align=right data-sort-value="0.81" | 810 m || 
|-id=318 bgcolor=#fefefe
| 416318 ||  || — || September 17, 2003 || Kitt Peak || Spacewatch || — || align=right | 1.0 km || 
|-id=319 bgcolor=#fefefe
| 416319 ||  || — || September 21, 2003 || Haleakala || NEAT || — || align=right data-sort-value="0.68" | 680 m || 
|-id=320 bgcolor=#d6d6d6
| 416320 ||  || — || September 20, 2003 || Palomar || NEAT || — || align=right | 2.9 km || 
|-id=321 bgcolor=#fefefe
| 416321 ||  || — || September 17, 2003 || Socorro || LINEAR || — || align=right data-sort-value="0.76" | 760 m || 
|-id=322 bgcolor=#d6d6d6
| 416322 ||  || — || September 19, 2003 || Anderson Mesa || LONEOS || — || align=right | 3.4 km || 
|-id=323 bgcolor=#fefefe
| 416323 ||  || — || September 18, 2003 || Kitt Peak || Spacewatch || — || align=right data-sort-value="0.64" | 640 m || 
|-id=324 bgcolor=#fefefe
| 416324 ||  || — || September 20, 2003 || Anderson Mesa || LONEOS || — || align=right data-sort-value="0.84" | 840 m || 
|-id=325 bgcolor=#d6d6d6
| 416325 ||  || — || September 18, 2003 || Palomar || NEAT || — || align=right | 2.5 km || 
|-id=326 bgcolor=#fefefe
| 416326 ||  || — || September 19, 2003 || Socorro || LINEAR || — || align=right data-sort-value="0.62" | 620 m || 
|-id=327 bgcolor=#d6d6d6
| 416327 ||  || — || September 19, 2003 || Palomar || NEAT || — || align=right | 2.5 km || 
|-id=328 bgcolor=#fefefe
| 416328 ||  || — || September 21, 2003 || Kitt Peak || Spacewatch || — || align=right data-sort-value="0.69" | 690 m || 
|-id=329 bgcolor=#d6d6d6
| 416329 ||  || — || September 20, 2003 || Palomar || NEAT || — || align=right | 3.4 km || 
|-id=330 bgcolor=#fefefe
| 416330 ||  || — || September 20, 2003 || Kitt Peak || Spacewatch || ERI || align=right | 1.4 km || 
|-id=331 bgcolor=#fefefe
| 416331 ||  || — || September 20, 2003 || Palomar || NEAT || — || align=right data-sort-value="0.76" | 760 m || 
|-id=332 bgcolor=#fefefe
| 416332 ||  || — || September 22, 2003 || Anderson Mesa || LONEOS || — || align=right data-sort-value="0.72" | 720 m || 
|-id=333 bgcolor=#fefefe
| 416333 ||  || — || September 22, 2003 || Anderson Mesa || LONEOS || — || align=right data-sort-value="0.60" | 600 m || 
|-id=334 bgcolor=#fefefe
| 416334 ||  || — || September 25, 2003 || Haleakala || NEAT || — || align=right data-sort-value="0.71" | 710 m || 
|-id=335 bgcolor=#d6d6d6
| 416335 ||  || — || September 26, 2003 || Socorro || LINEAR || — || align=right | 3.2 km || 
|-id=336 bgcolor=#fefefe
| 416336 ||  || — || September 27, 2003 || Socorro || LINEAR || H || align=right data-sort-value="0.73" | 730 m || 
|-id=337 bgcolor=#d6d6d6
| 416337 ||  || — || September 28, 2003 || Desert Eagle || W. K. Y. Yeung || EOS || align=right | 2.2 km || 
|-id=338 bgcolor=#d6d6d6
| 416338 ||  || — || September 29, 2003 || Kitt Peak || Spacewatch || — || align=right | 2.5 km || 
|-id=339 bgcolor=#d6d6d6
| 416339 ||  || — || September 28, 2003 || Kitt Peak || Spacewatch || — || align=right | 3.1 km || 
|-id=340 bgcolor=#fefefe
| 416340 ||  || — || September 18, 2003 || Socorro || LINEAR || — || align=right data-sort-value="0.98" | 980 m || 
|-id=341 bgcolor=#fefefe
| 416341 ||  || — || September 19, 2003 || Kitt Peak || Spacewatch || — || align=right data-sort-value="0.72" | 720 m || 
|-id=342 bgcolor=#d6d6d6
| 416342 ||  || — || September 28, 2003 || Anderson Mesa || LONEOS || — || align=right | 3.4 km || 
|-id=343 bgcolor=#d6d6d6
| 416343 ||  || — || September 28, 2003 || Socorro || LINEAR || — || align=right | 3.4 km || 
|-id=344 bgcolor=#d6d6d6
| 416344 ||  || — || September 20, 2003 || Palomar || NEAT || — || align=right | 2.8 km || 
|-id=345 bgcolor=#d6d6d6
| 416345 ||  || — || September 26, 2003 || Socorro || LINEAR || — || align=right | 3.7 km || 
|-id=346 bgcolor=#fefefe
| 416346 ||  || — || September 16, 2003 || Kitt Peak || Spacewatch || — || align=right data-sort-value="0.61" | 610 m || 
|-id=347 bgcolor=#fefefe
| 416347 ||  || — || September 19, 2003 || Palomar || NEAT || — || align=right data-sort-value="0.91" | 910 m || 
|-id=348 bgcolor=#fefefe
| 416348 ||  || — || September 21, 2003 || Kitt Peak || Spacewatch || — || align=right data-sort-value="0.71" | 710 m || 
|-id=349 bgcolor=#fefefe
| 416349 ||  || — || September 21, 2003 || Kitt Peak || Spacewatch || — || align=right data-sort-value="0.76" | 760 m || 
|-id=350 bgcolor=#d6d6d6
| 416350 ||  || — || October 20, 2003 || Kitt Peak || Spacewatch || EOS || align=right | 1.6 km || 
|-id=351 bgcolor=#fefefe
| 416351 ||  || — || October 16, 2003 || Palomar || NEAT || — || align=right | 1.0 km || 
|-id=352 bgcolor=#d6d6d6
| 416352 ||  || — || September 30, 2003 || Socorro || LINEAR || — || align=right | 4.3 km || 
|-id=353 bgcolor=#fefefe
| 416353 ||  || — || September 26, 2003 || Apache Point || SDSS || — || align=right data-sort-value="0.70" | 700 m || 
|-id=354 bgcolor=#fefefe
| 416354 ||  || — || September 18, 2003 || Kitt Peak || Spacewatch || — || align=right data-sort-value="0.51" | 510 m || 
|-id=355 bgcolor=#d6d6d6
| 416355 ||  || — || September 28, 2003 || Anderson Mesa || LONEOS || — || align=right | 3.6 km || 
|-id=356 bgcolor=#d6d6d6
| 416356 ||  || — || September 26, 2003 || Apache Point || SDSS || — || align=right | 2.7 km || 
|-id=357 bgcolor=#d6d6d6
| 416357 ||  || — || September 26, 2003 || Apache Point || SDSS || — || align=right | 2.6 km || 
|-id=358 bgcolor=#fefefe
| 416358 ||  || — || September 17, 2003 || Kitt Peak || Spacewatch || — || align=right data-sort-value="0.73" | 730 m || 
|-id=359 bgcolor=#fefefe
| 416359 ||  || — || September 20, 2003 || Kitt Peak || Spacewatch || — || align=right data-sort-value="0.58" | 580 m || 
|-id=360 bgcolor=#d6d6d6
| 416360 ||  || — || September 17, 2003 || Kitt Peak || Spacewatch || — || align=right | 2.8 km || 
|-id=361 bgcolor=#E9E9E9
| 416361 ||  || — || September 26, 2003 || Apache Point || SDSS || — || align=right | 1.8 km || 
|-id=362 bgcolor=#d6d6d6
| 416362 ||  || — || October 18, 2003 || Kitt Peak || Spacewatch || EOS || align=right | 1.6 km || 
|-id=363 bgcolor=#d6d6d6
| 416363 ||  || — || September 26, 2003 || Apache Point || SDSS || — || align=right | 2.4 km || 
|-id=364 bgcolor=#d6d6d6
| 416364 ||  || — || September 26, 2003 || Apache Point || SDSS || EOS || align=right | 1.9 km || 
|-id=365 bgcolor=#d6d6d6
| 416365 ||  || — || September 27, 2003 || Apache Point || SDSS || EOS || align=right | 1.9 km || 
|-id=366 bgcolor=#fefefe
| 416366 ||  || — || September 28, 2003 || Apache Point || SDSS || — || align=right data-sort-value="0.72" | 720 m || 
|-id=367 bgcolor=#d6d6d6
| 416367 ||  || — || September 28, 2003 || Apache Point || SDSS || EOS || align=right | 2.1 km || 
|-id=368 bgcolor=#fefefe
| 416368 ||  || — || September 18, 2003 || Kitt Peak || Spacewatch || V || align=right data-sort-value="0.51" | 510 m || 
|-id=369 bgcolor=#fefefe
| 416369 ||  || — || September 18, 2003 || Kitt Peak || Spacewatch || V || align=right data-sort-value="0.60" | 600 m || 
|-id=370 bgcolor=#d6d6d6
| 416370 ||  || — || September 20, 2003 || Palomar || NEAT || — || align=right | 3.2 km || 
|-id=371 bgcolor=#fefefe
| 416371 ||  || — || September 30, 2003 || Kitt Peak || Spacewatch || V || align=right data-sort-value="0.57" | 570 m || 
|-id=372 bgcolor=#d6d6d6
| 416372 ||  || — || October 2, 2003 || Haleakala || NEAT || — || align=right | 3.3 km || 
|-id=373 bgcolor=#fefefe
| 416373 ||  || — || October 14, 2003 || Palomar || NEAT || — || align=right data-sort-value="0.67" | 670 m || 
|-id=374 bgcolor=#d6d6d6
| 416374 ||  || — || October 1, 2003 || Kitt Peak || Spacewatch || — || align=right | 2.5 km || 
|-id=375 bgcolor=#d6d6d6
| 416375 ||  || — || September 20, 2003 || Kitt Peak || Spacewatch || EOS || align=right | 1.8 km || 
|-id=376 bgcolor=#d6d6d6
| 416376 ||  || — || October 1, 2003 || Kitt Peak || Spacewatch || — || align=right | 2.5 km || 
|-id=377 bgcolor=#d6d6d6
| 416377 ||  || — || October 3, 2003 || Kitt Peak || Spacewatch || — || align=right | 2.7 km || 
|-id=378 bgcolor=#d6d6d6
| 416378 ||  || — || October 3, 2003 || Kitt Peak || Spacewatch || — || align=right | 2.8 km || 
|-id=379 bgcolor=#fefefe
| 416379 ||  || — || October 5, 2003 || Kitt Peak || Spacewatch || — || align=right data-sort-value="0.68" | 680 m || 
|-id=380 bgcolor=#fefefe
| 416380 ||  || — || October 16, 2003 || Kitt Peak || Spacewatch || — || align=right data-sort-value="0.72" | 720 m || 
|-id=381 bgcolor=#fefefe
| 416381 ||  || — || October 16, 2003 || Socorro || LINEAR || H || align=right | 1.0 km || 
|-id=382 bgcolor=#fefefe
| 416382 ||  || — || October 20, 2003 || Nashville || R. Clingan || NYS || align=right data-sort-value="0.62" | 620 m || 
|-id=383 bgcolor=#fefefe
| 416383 ||  || — || September 21, 2003 || Anderson Mesa || LONEOS || H || align=right data-sort-value="0.64" | 640 m || 
|-id=384 bgcolor=#d6d6d6
| 416384 ||  || — || October 16, 2003 || Kitt Peak || Spacewatch || — || align=right | 2.9 km || 
|-id=385 bgcolor=#fefefe
| 416385 ||  || — || October 18, 2003 || Kitt Peak || Spacewatch || — || align=right data-sort-value="0.79" | 790 m || 
|-id=386 bgcolor=#FA8072
| 416386 ||  || — || October 21, 2003 || Socorro || LINEAR || — || align=right | 1.3 km || 
|-id=387 bgcolor=#d6d6d6
| 416387 ||  || — || October 19, 2003 || Kitt Peak || Spacewatch || — || align=right | 2.9 km || 
|-id=388 bgcolor=#d6d6d6
| 416388 ||  || — || October 22, 2003 || Kitt Peak || Spacewatch || — || align=right | 2.5 km || 
|-id=389 bgcolor=#fefefe
| 416389 ||  || — || October 17, 2003 || Kitt Peak || Spacewatch || — || align=right data-sort-value="0.66" | 660 m || 
|-id=390 bgcolor=#fefefe
| 416390 ||  || — || October 16, 2003 || Kitt Peak || Spacewatch || — || align=right data-sort-value="0.83" | 830 m || 
|-id=391 bgcolor=#d6d6d6
| 416391 ||  || — || October 18, 2003 || Palomar || NEAT || — || align=right | 4.4 km || 
|-id=392 bgcolor=#d6d6d6
| 416392 ||  || — || October 18, 2003 || Palomar || NEAT || — || align=right | 3.4 km || 
|-id=393 bgcolor=#fefefe
| 416393 ||  || — || October 16, 2003 || Palomar || NEAT || — || align=right data-sort-value="0.87" | 870 m || 
|-id=394 bgcolor=#d6d6d6
| 416394 ||  || — || October 16, 2003 || Kitt Peak || Spacewatch || EOS || align=right | 1.2 km || 
|-id=395 bgcolor=#fefefe
| 416395 ||  || — || October 20, 2003 || Kitt Peak || Spacewatch || V || align=right data-sort-value="0.48" | 480 m || 
|-id=396 bgcolor=#fefefe
| 416396 ||  || — || October 19, 2003 || Kitt Peak || Spacewatch || MAS || align=right data-sort-value="0.63" | 630 m || 
|-id=397 bgcolor=#d6d6d6
| 416397 ||  || — || October 18, 2003 || Palomar || NEAT || — || align=right | 4.0 km || 
|-id=398 bgcolor=#fefefe
| 416398 ||  || — || October 20, 2003 || Kitt Peak || Spacewatch || NYS || align=right data-sort-value="0.62" | 620 m || 
|-id=399 bgcolor=#fefefe
| 416399 ||  || — || October 21, 2003 || Kitt Peak || Spacewatch || — || align=right data-sort-value="0.67" | 670 m || 
|-id=400 bgcolor=#C2E0FF
| 416400 ||  || — || October 24, 2003 || Kitt Peak || Spacewatch || Haumea || align=right | 381 km || 
|}

416401–416500 

|-bgcolor=#d6d6d6
| 416401 ||  || — || October 1, 2003 || Kitt Peak || Spacewatch || — || align=right | 2.6 km || 
|-id=402 bgcolor=#fefefe
| 416402 ||  || — || October 19, 2003 || Kitt Peak || Spacewatch || MAS || align=right data-sort-value="0.64" | 640 m || 
|-id=403 bgcolor=#fefefe
| 416403 ||  || — || October 19, 2003 || Palomar || NEAT || — || align=right data-sort-value="0.66" | 660 m || 
|-id=404 bgcolor=#FA8072
| 416404 ||  || — || October 19, 2003 || Palomar || NEAT || — || align=right data-sort-value="0.88" | 880 m || 
|-id=405 bgcolor=#fefefe
| 416405 ||  || — || September 28, 2003 || Socorro || LINEAR || — || align=right data-sort-value="0.79" | 790 m || 
|-id=406 bgcolor=#d6d6d6
| 416406 ||  || — || October 16, 2003 || Palomar || NEAT || — || align=right | 2.3 km || 
|-id=407 bgcolor=#fefefe
| 416407 ||  || — || October 16, 2003 || Anderson Mesa || LONEOS || — || align=right data-sort-value="0.97" | 970 m || 
|-id=408 bgcolor=#d6d6d6
| 416408 ||  || — || October 18, 2003 || Anderson Mesa || LONEOS || — || align=right | 3.4 km || 
|-id=409 bgcolor=#d6d6d6
| 416409 ||  || — || September 28, 2003 || Socorro || LINEAR || — || align=right | 3.2 km || 
|-id=410 bgcolor=#fefefe
| 416410 ||  || — || September 28, 2003 || Kitt Peak || Spacewatch || — || align=right data-sort-value="0.94" | 940 m || 
|-id=411 bgcolor=#fefefe
| 416411 ||  || — || October 21, 2003 || Anderson Mesa || LONEOS || — || align=right data-sort-value="0.65" | 650 m || 
|-id=412 bgcolor=#fefefe
| 416412 ||  || — || October 21, 2003 || Palomar || NEAT || — || align=right data-sort-value="0.90" | 900 m || 
|-id=413 bgcolor=#fefefe
| 416413 ||  || — || October 21, 2003 || Socorro || LINEAR || — || align=right data-sort-value="0.90" | 900 m || 
|-id=414 bgcolor=#d6d6d6
| 416414 ||  || — || October 21, 2003 || Socorro || LINEAR || — || align=right | 4.1 km || 
|-id=415 bgcolor=#d6d6d6
| 416415 ||  || — || October 21, 2003 || Palomar || NEAT || — || align=right | 3.1 km || 
|-id=416 bgcolor=#fefefe
| 416416 ||  || — || October 22, 2003 || Kitt Peak || Spacewatch || — || align=right | 1.0 km || 
|-id=417 bgcolor=#d6d6d6
| 416417 ||  || — || October 2, 2003 || Kitt Peak || Spacewatch || — || align=right | 3.1 km || 
|-id=418 bgcolor=#fefefe
| 416418 ||  || — || October 20, 2003 || Kitt Peak || Spacewatch || — || align=right data-sort-value="0.75" | 750 m || 
|-id=419 bgcolor=#d6d6d6
| 416419 ||  || — || October 22, 2003 || Socorro || LINEAR || — || align=right | 3.3 km || 
|-id=420 bgcolor=#fefefe
| 416420 ||  || — || October 23, 2003 || Kitt Peak || Spacewatch || NYS || align=right data-sort-value="0.74" | 740 m || 
|-id=421 bgcolor=#d6d6d6
| 416421 ||  || — || October 17, 2003 || Kitt Peak || Spacewatch || EOS || align=right | 2.5 km || 
|-id=422 bgcolor=#d6d6d6
| 416422 ||  || — || October 22, 2003 || Kitt Peak || Spacewatch || — || align=right | 3.0 km || 
|-id=423 bgcolor=#fefefe
| 416423 ||  || — || October 24, 2003 || Socorro || LINEAR || — || align=right | 1.4 km || 
|-id=424 bgcolor=#fefefe
| 416424 ||  || — || September 22, 2003 || Kitt Peak || Spacewatch || — || align=right data-sort-value="0.73" | 730 m || 
|-id=425 bgcolor=#fefefe
| 416425 ||  || — || October 24, 2003 || Socorro || LINEAR || V || align=right data-sort-value="0.80" | 800 m || 
|-id=426 bgcolor=#d6d6d6
| 416426 ||  || — || October 23, 2003 || Kitt Peak || Spacewatch || — || align=right | 2.7 km || 
|-id=427 bgcolor=#fefefe
| 416427 ||  || — || October 24, 2003 || Socorro || LINEAR || NYS || align=right data-sort-value="0.59" | 590 m || 
|-id=428 bgcolor=#fefefe
| 416428 ||  || — || October 25, 2003 || Socorro || LINEAR || — || align=right data-sort-value="0.90" | 900 m || 
|-id=429 bgcolor=#d6d6d6
| 416429 ||  || — || October 19, 2003 || Kitt Peak || Spacewatch || EOS || align=right | 2.0 km || 
|-id=430 bgcolor=#fefefe
| 416430 ||  || — || October 27, 2003 || Socorro || LINEAR || — || align=right data-sort-value="0.80" | 800 m || 
|-id=431 bgcolor=#fefefe
| 416431 ||  || — || October 28, 2003 || Socorro || LINEAR || NYS || align=right data-sort-value="0.66" | 660 m || 
|-id=432 bgcolor=#fefefe
| 416432 ||  || — || October 26, 2003 || Kitt Peak || Spacewatch || — || align=right data-sort-value="0.78" | 780 m || 
|-id=433 bgcolor=#d6d6d6
| 416433 ||  || — || September 16, 2003 || Kitt Peak || Spacewatch || — || align=right | 2.2 km || 
|-id=434 bgcolor=#fefefe
| 416434 ||  || — || October 23, 2003 || Kitt Peak || Spacewatch || — || align=right data-sort-value="0.68" | 680 m || 
|-id=435 bgcolor=#d6d6d6
| 416435 ||  || — || September 17, 2003 || Kitt Peak || Spacewatch || — || align=right | 2.7 km || 
|-id=436 bgcolor=#fefefe
| 416436 ||  || — || October 23, 2003 || Apache Point || SDSS || — || align=right data-sort-value="0.76" | 760 m || 
|-id=437 bgcolor=#d6d6d6
| 416437 ||  || — || September 16, 2003 || Kitt Peak || Spacewatch || EOS || align=right | 1.5 km || 
|-id=438 bgcolor=#d6d6d6
| 416438 ||  || — || September 18, 2003 || Kitt Peak || Spacewatch || EOS || align=right | 1.5 km || 
|-id=439 bgcolor=#fefefe
| 416439 ||  || — || October 19, 2003 || Apache Point || SDSS || — || align=right data-sort-value="0.75" | 750 m || 
|-id=440 bgcolor=#d6d6d6
| 416440 ||  || — || September 26, 2003 || Apache Point || SDSS || — || align=right | 2.9 km || 
|-id=441 bgcolor=#d6d6d6
| 416441 ||  || — || October 21, 2003 || Kitt Peak || Spacewatch || — || align=right | 3.2 km || 
|-id=442 bgcolor=#d6d6d6
| 416442 ||  || — || October 22, 2003 || Apache Point || SDSS || — || align=right | 3.0 km || 
|-id=443 bgcolor=#d6d6d6
| 416443 ||  || — || October 22, 2003 || Apache Point || SDSS || BRA || align=right | 1.6 km || 
|-id=444 bgcolor=#fefefe
| 416444 ||  || — || October 22, 2003 || Apache Point || SDSS || V || align=right data-sort-value="0.54" | 540 m || 
|-id=445 bgcolor=#fefefe
| 416445 ||  || — || October 23, 2003 || Apache Point || SDSS || (2076) || align=right data-sort-value="0.66" | 660 m || 
|-id=446 bgcolor=#fefefe
| 416446 ||  || — || November 5, 2003 || Socorro || LINEAR || — || align=right | 1.1 km || 
|-id=447 bgcolor=#fefefe
| 416447 ||  || — || November 14, 2003 || Palomar || NEAT || — || align=right data-sort-value="0.91" | 910 m || 
|-id=448 bgcolor=#fefefe
| 416448 ||  || — || November 14, 2003 || Palomar || NEAT || — || align=right data-sort-value="0.77" | 770 m || 
|-id=449 bgcolor=#d6d6d6
| 416449 ||  || — || November 15, 2003 || Kitt Peak || Spacewatch || — || align=right | 2.3 km || 
|-id=450 bgcolor=#fefefe
| 416450 ||  || — || November 15, 2003 || Palomar || NEAT || — || align=right | 1.5 km || 
|-id=451 bgcolor=#FA8072
| 416451 ||  || — || November 1, 2003 || Socorro || LINEAR || — || align=right data-sort-value="0.79" | 790 m || 
|-id=452 bgcolor=#d6d6d6
| 416452 ||  || — || November 16, 2003 || Kitt Peak || Spacewatch || — || align=right | 3.7 km || 
|-id=453 bgcolor=#fefefe
| 416453 ||  || — || October 27, 2003 || Kitt Peak || Spacewatch || — || align=right data-sort-value="0.80" | 800 m || 
|-id=454 bgcolor=#fefefe
| 416454 ||  || — || November 18, 2003 || Kitt Peak || Spacewatch || — || align=right data-sort-value="0.81" | 810 m || 
|-id=455 bgcolor=#d6d6d6
| 416455 ||  || — || November 16, 2003 || Kitt Peak || Spacewatch || — || align=right | 2.8 km || 
|-id=456 bgcolor=#d6d6d6
| 416456 ||  || — || November 19, 2003 || Socorro || LINEAR || — || align=right | 3.1 km || 
|-id=457 bgcolor=#d6d6d6
| 416457 ||  || — || November 19, 2003 || Socorro || LINEAR || — || align=right | 3.6 km || 
|-id=458 bgcolor=#fefefe
| 416458 ||  || — || November 19, 2003 || Socorro || LINEAR || H || align=right data-sort-value="0.71" | 710 m || 
|-id=459 bgcolor=#d6d6d6
| 416459 ||  || — || October 17, 2003 || Kitt Peak || Spacewatch || EOS || align=right | 2.1 km || 
|-id=460 bgcolor=#d6d6d6
| 416460 ||  || — || November 19, 2003 || Kitt Peak || Spacewatch || Tj (2.98) || align=right | 4.3 km || 
|-id=461 bgcolor=#d6d6d6
| 416461 ||  || — || November 20, 2003 || Socorro || LINEAR || — || align=right | 4.6 km || 
|-id=462 bgcolor=#fefefe
| 416462 ||  || — || November 19, 2003 || Kitt Peak || Spacewatch || — || align=right | 1.1 km || 
|-id=463 bgcolor=#fefefe
| 416463 ||  || — || November 18, 2003 || Kitt Peak || Spacewatch || — || align=right data-sort-value="0.63" | 630 m || 
|-id=464 bgcolor=#fefefe
| 416464 ||  || — || November 19, 2003 || Kitt Peak || Spacewatch || — || align=right data-sort-value="0.92" | 920 m || 
|-id=465 bgcolor=#d6d6d6
| 416465 ||  || — || November 19, 2003 || Kitt Peak || Spacewatch || — || align=right | 3.2 km || 
|-id=466 bgcolor=#d6d6d6
| 416466 ||  || — || November 19, 2003 || Socorro || LINEAR || — || align=right | 5.6 km || 
|-id=467 bgcolor=#d6d6d6
| 416467 ||  || — || November 19, 2003 || Kitt Peak || Spacewatch || — || align=right | 2.2 km || 
|-id=468 bgcolor=#fefefe
| 416468 ||  || — || November 20, 2003 || Socorro || LINEAR || — || align=right data-sort-value="0.94" | 940 m || 
|-id=469 bgcolor=#d6d6d6
| 416469 ||  || — || November 20, 2003 || Socorro || LINEAR || — || align=right | 3.2 km || 
|-id=470 bgcolor=#FA8072
| 416470 ||  || — || November 19, 2003 || Socorro || LINEAR || — || align=right | 2.9 km || 
|-id=471 bgcolor=#fefefe
| 416471 ||  || — || November 21, 2003 || Socorro || LINEAR || — || align=right | 1.1 km || 
|-id=472 bgcolor=#fefefe
| 416472 ||  || — || November 16, 2003 || Catalina || CSS || — || align=right data-sort-value="0.79" | 790 m || 
|-id=473 bgcolor=#d6d6d6
| 416473 ||  || — || November 18, 2003 || Kitt Peak || Spacewatch || — || align=right | 2.7 km || 
|-id=474 bgcolor=#fefefe
| 416474 ||  || — || October 19, 2003 || Palomar || NEAT || — || align=right data-sort-value="0.88" | 880 m || 
|-id=475 bgcolor=#fefefe
| 416475 ||  || — || November 19, 2003 || Anderson Mesa || LONEOS || — || align=right data-sort-value="0.80" | 800 m || 
|-id=476 bgcolor=#d6d6d6
| 416476 ||  || — || November 21, 2003 || Socorro || LINEAR || — || align=right | 2.9 km || 
|-id=477 bgcolor=#d6d6d6
| 416477 ||  || — || November 22, 2003 || Nogales || Tenagra II Obs. || EOS || align=right | 2.4 km || 
|-id=478 bgcolor=#fefefe
| 416478 ||  || — || November 20, 2003 || Socorro || LINEAR || — || align=right | 1.0 km || 
|-id=479 bgcolor=#d6d6d6
| 416479 ||  || — || November 20, 2003 || Socorro || LINEAR || — || align=right | 2.2 km || 
|-id=480 bgcolor=#d6d6d6
| 416480 ||  || — || November 20, 2003 || Socorro || LINEAR || — || align=right | 3.4 km || 
|-id=481 bgcolor=#fefefe
| 416481 ||  || — || November 20, 2003 || Socorro || LINEAR || — || align=right data-sort-value="0.66" | 660 m || 
|-id=482 bgcolor=#d6d6d6
| 416482 ||  || — || November 20, 2003 || Socorro || LINEAR || — || align=right | 4.0 km || 
|-id=483 bgcolor=#d6d6d6
| 416483 ||  || — || November 20, 2003 || Socorro || LINEAR || — || align=right | 5.9 km || 
|-id=484 bgcolor=#d6d6d6
| 416484 ||  || — || November 20, 2003 || Socorro || LINEAR || Tj (2.99) || align=right | 6.1 km || 
|-id=485 bgcolor=#d6d6d6
| 416485 ||  || — || November 21, 2003 || Socorro || LINEAR || — || align=right | 4.8 km || 
|-id=486 bgcolor=#fefefe
| 416486 ||  || — || November 21, 2003 || Socorro || LINEAR || NYS || align=right data-sort-value="0.63" | 630 m || 
|-id=487 bgcolor=#fefefe
| 416487 ||  || — || November 19, 2003 || Anderson Mesa || LONEOS || V || align=right data-sort-value="0.75" | 750 m || 
|-id=488 bgcolor=#d6d6d6
| 416488 ||  || — || November 26, 2003 || Anderson Mesa || LONEOS || — || align=right | 2.9 km || 
|-id=489 bgcolor=#fefefe
| 416489 ||  || — || November 29, 2003 || Socorro || LINEAR || — || align=right | 1.0 km || 
|-id=490 bgcolor=#d6d6d6
| 416490 ||  || — || November 29, 2003 || Kitt Peak || Spacewatch || — || align=right | 2.1 km || 
|-id=491 bgcolor=#FA8072
| 416491 ||  || — || November 30, 2003 || Kitt Peak || Spacewatch || — || align=right data-sort-value="0.45" | 450 m || 
|-id=492 bgcolor=#d6d6d6
| 416492 ||  || — || September 28, 2003 || Kitt Peak || Spacewatch || — || align=right | 2.3 km || 
|-id=493 bgcolor=#fefefe
| 416493 ||  || — || October 2, 2003 || Kitt Peak || Spacewatch || — || align=right data-sort-value="0.66" | 660 m || 
|-id=494 bgcolor=#fefefe
| 416494 ||  || — || October 22, 2003 || Anderson Mesa || LONEOS || H || align=right data-sort-value="0.96" | 960 m || 
|-id=495 bgcolor=#d6d6d6
| 416495 ||  || — || December 14, 2003 || Kitt Peak || Spacewatch || — || align=right | 2.9 km || 
|-id=496 bgcolor=#d6d6d6
| 416496 ||  || — || December 14, 2003 || Palomar || NEAT || — || align=right | 3.7 km || 
|-id=497 bgcolor=#fefefe
| 416497 ||  || — || November 26, 2003 || Kitt Peak || Spacewatch || — || align=right data-sort-value="0.95" | 950 m || 
|-id=498 bgcolor=#fefefe
| 416498 ||  || — || November 19, 2003 || Kitt Peak || Spacewatch || — || align=right data-sort-value="0.62" | 620 m || 
|-id=499 bgcolor=#d6d6d6
| 416499 ||  || — || November 19, 2003 || Kitt Peak || Spacewatch || — || align=right | 4.1 km || 
|-id=500 bgcolor=#d6d6d6
| 416500 ||  || — || December 15, 2003 || Socorro || LINEAR || — || align=right | 3.7 km || 
|}

416501–416600 

|-bgcolor=#FA8072
| 416501 ||  || — || December 18, 2003 || Socorro || LINEAR || — || align=right data-sort-value="0.56" | 560 m || 
|-id=502 bgcolor=#C2FFFF
| 416502 ||  || — || December 20, 2003 || Nashville || R. Clingan || L5 || align=right | 13 km || 
|-id=503 bgcolor=#d6d6d6
| 416503 ||  || — || December 17, 2003 || Socorro || LINEAR || — || align=right | 3.7 km || 
|-id=504 bgcolor=#d6d6d6
| 416504 ||  || — || December 17, 2003 || Anderson Mesa || LONEOS || — || align=right | 4.3 km || 
|-id=505 bgcolor=#d6d6d6
| 416505 ||  || — || December 19, 2003 || Kitt Peak || Spacewatch || — || align=right | 3.5 km || 
|-id=506 bgcolor=#d6d6d6
| 416506 ||  || — || December 19, 2003 || Kitt Peak || Spacewatch || — || align=right | 3.3 km || 
|-id=507 bgcolor=#d6d6d6
| 416507 ||  || — || December 17, 2003 || Socorro || LINEAR || THB || align=right | 3.6 km || 
|-id=508 bgcolor=#d6d6d6
| 416508 ||  || — || December 19, 2003 || Socorro || LINEAR || — || align=right | 6.2 km || 
|-id=509 bgcolor=#d6d6d6
| 416509 ||  || — || December 19, 2003 || Socorro || LINEAR || — || align=right | 2.7 km || 
|-id=510 bgcolor=#fefefe
| 416510 ||  || — || December 21, 2003 || Socorro || LINEAR || H || align=right data-sort-value="0.80" | 800 m || 
|-id=511 bgcolor=#d6d6d6
| 416511 ||  || — || December 18, 2003 || Socorro || LINEAR || — || align=right | 2.5 km || 
|-id=512 bgcolor=#d6d6d6
| 416512 ||  || — || December 21, 2003 || Socorro || LINEAR || EMA || align=right | 3.3 km || 
|-id=513 bgcolor=#C2FFFF
| 416513 ||  || — || December 21, 2003 || Needville || Needville Obs. || L5 || align=right | 10 km || 
|-id=514 bgcolor=#d6d6d6
| 416514 ||  || — || December 19, 2003 || Socorro || LINEAR || — || align=right | 3.4 km || 
|-id=515 bgcolor=#d6d6d6
| 416515 ||  || — || December 23, 2003 || Socorro || LINEAR || — || align=right | 3.8 km || 
|-id=516 bgcolor=#fefefe
| 416516 ||  || — || December 17, 2003 || Socorro || LINEAR || — || align=right data-sort-value="0.86" | 860 m || 
|-id=517 bgcolor=#fefefe
| 416517 ||  || — || December 23, 2003 || Socorro || LINEAR || — || align=right data-sort-value="0.82" | 820 m || 
|-id=518 bgcolor=#fefefe
| 416518 ||  || — || December 27, 2003 || Socorro || LINEAR || — || align=right data-sort-value="0.91" | 910 m || 
|-id=519 bgcolor=#d6d6d6
| 416519 ||  || — || December 27, 2003 || Socorro || LINEAR || Tj (2.98) || align=right | 2.8 km || 
|-id=520 bgcolor=#fefefe
| 416520 ||  || — || December 28, 2003 || Kitt Peak || Spacewatch || NYS || align=right data-sort-value="0.68" | 680 m || 
|-id=521 bgcolor=#fefefe
| 416521 ||  || — || December 28, 2003 || Socorro || LINEAR || H || align=right data-sort-value="0.82" | 820 m || 
|-id=522 bgcolor=#d6d6d6
| 416522 ||  || — || December 28, 2003 || Kitt Peak || Spacewatch || — || align=right | 4.6 km || 
|-id=523 bgcolor=#fefefe
| 416523 ||  || — || December 28, 2003 || Socorro || LINEAR || — || align=right data-sort-value="0.94" | 940 m || 
|-id=524 bgcolor=#d6d6d6
| 416524 ||  || — || December 28, 2003 || Socorro || LINEAR || — || align=right | 3.1 km || 
|-id=525 bgcolor=#d6d6d6
| 416525 ||  || — || December 18, 2003 || Kitt Peak || Spacewatch || — || align=right | 3.9 km || 
|-id=526 bgcolor=#d6d6d6
| 416526 ||  || — || December 18, 2003 || Kitt Peak || Spacewatch || — || align=right | 2.8 km || 
|-id=527 bgcolor=#fefefe
| 416527 ||  || — || December 19, 2003 || Kitt Peak || Spacewatch || — || align=right data-sort-value="0.75" | 750 m || 
|-id=528 bgcolor=#d6d6d6
| 416528 ||  || — || December 22, 2003 || Kitt Peak || Spacewatch || — || align=right | 3.0 km || 
|-id=529 bgcolor=#fefefe
| 416529 ||  || — || December 21, 2003 || Apache Point || SDSS || NYS || align=right data-sort-value="0.68" | 680 m || 
|-id=530 bgcolor=#d6d6d6
| 416530 ||  || — || December 22, 2003 || Kitt Peak || Spacewatch || — || align=right | 3.3 km || 
|-id=531 bgcolor=#d6d6d6
| 416531 ||  || — || December 21, 2003 || Kitt Peak || Spacewatch || — || align=right | 2.4 km || 
|-id=532 bgcolor=#d6d6d6
| 416532 ||  || — || January 15, 2004 || Kitt Peak || Spacewatch || — || align=right | 3.8 km || 
|-id=533 bgcolor=#d6d6d6
| 416533 ||  || — || January 13, 2004 || Kitt Peak || Spacewatch || — || align=right | 3.7 km || 
|-id=534 bgcolor=#fefefe
| 416534 ||  || — || January 17, 2004 || Haleakala || NEAT || H || align=right data-sort-value="0.74" | 740 m || 
|-id=535 bgcolor=#fefefe
| 416535 ||  || — || January 17, 2004 || Palomar || NEAT || — || align=right | 2.5 km || 
|-id=536 bgcolor=#d6d6d6
| 416536 ||  || — || January 16, 2004 || Catalina || CSS || — || align=right | 3.2 km || 
|-id=537 bgcolor=#fefefe
| 416537 ||  || — || January 20, 2004 || Socorro || LINEAR || — || align=right data-sort-value="0.87" | 870 m || 
|-id=538 bgcolor=#d6d6d6
| 416538 ||  || — || December 27, 2003 || Kitt Peak || Spacewatch || — || align=right | 4.9 km || 
|-id=539 bgcolor=#d6d6d6
| 416539 ||  || — || January 21, 2004 || Socorro || LINEAR || Tj (2.97) || align=right | 4.0 km || 
|-id=540 bgcolor=#fefefe
| 416540 ||  || — || January 22, 2004 || Socorro || LINEAR || — || align=right data-sort-value="0.85" | 850 m || 
|-id=541 bgcolor=#fefefe
| 416541 ||  || — || January 23, 2004 || Anderson Mesa || LONEOS || — || align=right | 1.1 km || 
|-id=542 bgcolor=#d6d6d6
| 416542 ||  || — || January 22, 2004 || Socorro || LINEAR || — || align=right | 3.2 km || 
|-id=543 bgcolor=#d6d6d6
| 416543 ||  || — || January 22, 2004 || Socorro || LINEAR || — || align=right | 4.5 km || 
|-id=544 bgcolor=#d6d6d6
| 416544 ||  || — || January 22, 2004 || Socorro || LINEAR || — || align=right | 3.4 km || 
|-id=545 bgcolor=#d6d6d6
| 416545 ||  || — || January 27, 2004 || Socorro || LINEAR || — || align=right | 4.4 km || 
|-id=546 bgcolor=#d6d6d6
| 416546 ||  || — || January 20, 2004 || Kingsnake || J. V. McClusky || THB || align=right | 3.8 km || 
|-id=547 bgcolor=#d6d6d6
| 416547 ||  || — || January 23, 2004 || Socorro || LINEAR || — || align=right | 3.7 km || 
|-id=548 bgcolor=#d6d6d6
| 416548 ||  || — || January 24, 2004 || Socorro || LINEAR || — || align=right | 4.4 km || 
|-id=549 bgcolor=#d6d6d6
| 416549 ||  || — || January 24, 2004 || Socorro || LINEAR || — || align=right | 3.6 km || 
|-id=550 bgcolor=#d6d6d6
| 416550 ||  || — || January 31, 2004 || Socorro || LINEAR || — || align=right | 3.7 km || 
|-id=551 bgcolor=#fefefe
| 416551 ||  || — || December 27, 2003 || Socorro || LINEAR || — || align=right data-sort-value="0.91" | 910 m || 
|-id=552 bgcolor=#d6d6d6
| 416552 ||  || — || January 18, 2004 || Palomar || NEAT || — || align=right | 3.1 km || 
|-id=553 bgcolor=#d6d6d6
| 416553 ||  || — || February 11, 2004 || Palomar || NEAT || — || align=right | 4.4 km || 
|-id=554 bgcolor=#fefefe
| 416554 ||  || — || February 11, 2004 || Kitt Peak || Spacewatch || — || align=right data-sort-value="0.89" | 890 m || 
|-id=555 bgcolor=#d6d6d6
| 416555 ||  || — || February 11, 2004 || Kitt Peak || Spacewatch || — || align=right | 5.3 km || 
|-id=556 bgcolor=#d6d6d6
| 416556 ||  || — || February 14, 2004 || Haleakala || NEAT || — || align=right | 3.5 km || 
|-id=557 bgcolor=#d6d6d6
| 416557 ||  || — || February 13, 2004 || Palomar || NEAT || — || align=right | 3.2 km || 
|-id=558 bgcolor=#fefefe
| 416558 ||  || — || February 14, 2004 || Socorro || LINEAR || — || align=right | 1.1 km || 
|-id=559 bgcolor=#d6d6d6
| 416559 ||  || — || February 12, 2004 || Kitt Peak || Spacewatch || — || align=right | 3.4 km || 
|-id=560 bgcolor=#d6d6d6
| 416560 ||  || — || February 13, 2004 || Kitt Peak || Spacewatch || — || align=right | 2.8 km || 
|-id=561 bgcolor=#d6d6d6
| 416561 ||  || — || February 14, 2004 || Socorro || LINEAR || — || align=right | 4.3 km || 
|-id=562 bgcolor=#fefefe
| 416562 ||  || — || February 11, 2004 || Kitt Peak || Spacewatch || MAS || align=right data-sort-value="0.74" | 740 m || 
|-id=563 bgcolor=#d6d6d6
| 416563 ||  || — || February 11, 2004 || Kitt Peak || Spacewatch || — || align=right | 1.9 km || 
|-id=564 bgcolor=#d6d6d6
| 416564 ||  || — || January 18, 2004 || Catalina || CSS || — || align=right | 3.2 km || 
|-id=565 bgcolor=#fefefe
| 416565 ||  || — || February 16, 2004 || Kitt Peak || Spacewatch || — || align=right data-sort-value="0.82" | 820 m || 
|-id=566 bgcolor=#d6d6d6
| 416566 ||  || — || February 26, 2004 || Socorro || LINEAR || — || align=right | 3.4 km || 
|-id=567 bgcolor=#FFC2E0
| 416567 ||  || — || March 9, 2004 || Palomar || NEAT || AMO +1km || align=right | 2.5 km || 
|-id=568 bgcolor=#d6d6d6
| 416568 ||  || — || March 15, 2004 || Socorro || LINEAR || — || align=right | 3.6 km || 
|-id=569 bgcolor=#d6d6d6
| 416569 ||  || — || March 15, 2004 || Kitt Peak || Spacewatch || 7:4 || align=right | 3.1 km || 
|-id=570 bgcolor=#fefefe
| 416570 ||  || — || March 15, 2004 || Kitt Peak || Spacewatch || H || align=right data-sort-value="0.86" | 860 m || 
|-id=571 bgcolor=#d6d6d6
| 416571 ||  || — || March 15, 2004 || Socorro || LINEAR || — || align=right | 4.2 km || 
|-id=572 bgcolor=#fefefe
| 416572 ||  || — || March 15, 2004 || Socorro || LINEAR || — || align=right | 1.1 km || 
|-id=573 bgcolor=#fefefe
| 416573 ||  || — || March 12, 2004 || Palomar || NEAT || — || align=right data-sort-value="0.75" | 750 m || 
|-id=574 bgcolor=#d6d6d6
| 416574 ||  || — || March 15, 2004 || Socorro || LINEAR || — || align=right | 3.2 km || 
|-id=575 bgcolor=#fefefe
| 416575 ||  || — || March 13, 2004 || Palomar || NEAT || — || align=right | 1.1 km || 
|-id=576 bgcolor=#d6d6d6
| 416576 ||  || — || March 15, 2004 || Socorro || LINEAR || — || align=right | 3.4 km || 
|-id=577 bgcolor=#E9E9E9
| 416577 ||  || — || March 15, 2004 || Kitt Peak || Spacewatch || — || align=right | 1.6 km || 
|-id=578 bgcolor=#d6d6d6
| 416578 ||  || — || September 18, 2001 || Kitt Peak || Spacewatch || — || align=right | 3.5 km || 
|-id=579 bgcolor=#fefefe
| 416579 ||  || — || March 23, 2004 || Socorro || LINEAR || — || align=right | 1.1 km || 
|-id=580 bgcolor=#d6d6d6
| 416580 ||  || — || April 12, 2004 || Socorro || LINEAR || Tj (2.91) || align=right | 2.2 km || 
|-id=581 bgcolor=#E9E9E9
| 416581 ||  || — || April 13, 2004 || Kitt Peak || Spacewatch || — || align=right | 1.4 km || 
|-id=582 bgcolor=#E9E9E9
| 416582 ||  || — || April 19, 2004 || Socorro || LINEAR || — || align=right | 2.1 km || 
|-id=583 bgcolor=#E9E9E9
| 416583 Jacereece ||  ||  || May 8, 2004 || Wrightwood || J. W. Young || — || align=right | 1.5 km || 
|-id=584 bgcolor=#FFC2E0
| 416584 ||  || — || May 13, 2004 || Socorro || LINEAR || AMO || align=right data-sort-value="0.59" | 590 m || 
|-id=585 bgcolor=#E9E9E9
| 416585 ||  || — || May 15, 2004 || Socorro || LINEAR || JUN || align=right | 1.3 km || 
|-id=586 bgcolor=#E9E9E9
| 416586 ||  || — || May 15, 2004 || Socorro || LINEAR || — || align=right | 1.7 km || 
|-id=587 bgcolor=#E9E9E9
| 416587 ||  || — || May 15, 2004 || Socorro || LINEAR || — || align=right | 2.4 km || 
|-id=588 bgcolor=#FA8072
| 416588 ||  || — || May 15, 2004 || Socorro || LINEAR || — || align=right data-sort-value="0.86" | 860 m || 
|-id=589 bgcolor=#E9E9E9
| 416589 || 2004 KV || — || May 17, 2004 || Reedy Creek || J. Broughton || — || align=right | 2.0 km || 
|-id=590 bgcolor=#d6d6d6
| 416590 ||  || — || June 10, 2004 || Socorro || LINEAR || Tj (2.99) || align=right | 4.2 km || 
|-id=591 bgcolor=#FFC2E0
| 416591 ||  || — || June 11, 2004 || Socorro || LINEAR || APOPHA || align=right data-sort-value="0.68" | 680 m || 
|-id=592 bgcolor=#E9E9E9
| 416592 ||  || — || June 11, 2004 || Anderson Mesa || LONEOS || — || align=right | 2.7 km || 
|-id=593 bgcolor=#E9E9E9
| 416593 ||  || — || June 9, 2004 || Anderson Mesa || LONEOS || — || align=right | 1.8 km || 
|-id=594 bgcolor=#E9E9E9
| 416594 ||  || — || July 11, 2004 || Socorro || LINEAR || — || align=right | 3.0 km || 
|-id=595 bgcolor=#FA8072
| 416595 ||  || — || July 14, 2004 || Reedy Creek || J. Broughton || unusual || align=right | 3.2 km || 
|-id=596 bgcolor=#E9E9E9
| 416596 ||  || — || July 11, 2004 || Socorro || LINEAR || MAR || align=right | 1.4 km || 
|-id=597 bgcolor=#FA8072
| 416597 ||  || — || July 16, 2004 || Socorro || LINEAR || — || align=right data-sort-value="0.74" | 740 m || 
|-id=598 bgcolor=#fefefe
| 416598 ||  || — || August 7, 2004 || Palomar || NEAT || — || align=right data-sort-value="0.87" | 870 m || 
|-id=599 bgcolor=#E9E9E9
| 416599 ||  || — || August 8, 2004 || Anderson Mesa || LONEOS || — || align=right | 2.2 km || 
|-id=600 bgcolor=#d6d6d6
| 416600 ||  || — || August 7, 2004 || Campo Imperatore || CINEOS || — || align=right | 2.0 km || 
|}

416601–416700 

|-bgcolor=#E9E9E9
| 416601 ||  || — || March 24, 2003 || Kitt Peak || Spacewatch || DOR || align=right | 3.0 km || 
|-id=602 bgcolor=#E9E9E9
| 416602 ||  || — || August 9, 2004 || Anderson Mesa || LONEOS || MAR || align=right | 1.4 km || 
|-id=603 bgcolor=#fefefe
| 416603 ||  || — || August 3, 2004 || Siding Spring || SSS || — || align=right data-sort-value="0.62" | 620 m || 
|-id=604 bgcolor=#fefefe
| 416604 ||  || — || August 12, 2004 || Socorro || LINEAR || — || align=right data-sort-value="0.68" | 680 m || 
|-id=605 bgcolor=#E9E9E9
| 416605 ||  || — || August 12, 2004 || Mauna Kea || P. A. Wiegert || — || align=right | 1.8 km || 
|-id=606 bgcolor=#E9E9E9
| 416606 ||  || — || August 19, 2004 || Reedy Creek || J. Broughton || — || align=right | 1.8 km || 
|-id=607 bgcolor=#E9E9E9
| 416607 ||  || — || August 25, 2004 || Kitt Peak || Spacewatch || GEF || align=right | 1.2 km || 
|-id=608 bgcolor=#fefefe
| 416608 ||  || — || September 6, 2004 || Palomar || NEAT || — || align=right data-sort-value="0.65" | 650 m || 
|-id=609 bgcolor=#E9E9E9
| 416609 ||  || — || September 7, 2004 || Socorro || LINEAR || — || align=right | 2.2 km || 
|-id=610 bgcolor=#fefefe
| 416610 ||  || — || September 7, 2004 || Socorro || LINEAR || — || align=right data-sort-value="0.66" | 660 m || 
|-id=611 bgcolor=#E9E9E9
| 416611 ||  || — || September 8, 2004 || Socorro || LINEAR || — || align=right | 2.4 km || 
|-id=612 bgcolor=#E9E9E9
| 416612 ||  || — || September 8, 2004 || Socorro || LINEAR || — || align=right | 1.9 km || 
|-id=613 bgcolor=#E9E9E9
| 416613 ||  || — || September 8, 2004 || Socorro || LINEAR || — || align=right | 2.2 km || 
|-id=614 bgcolor=#fefefe
| 416614 ||  || — || September 8, 2004 || Socorro || LINEAR || — || align=right data-sort-value="0.69" | 690 m || 
|-id=615 bgcolor=#E9E9E9
| 416615 ||  || — || September 8, 2004 || Socorro || LINEAR || — || align=right | 2.3 km || 
|-id=616 bgcolor=#E9E9E9
| 416616 ||  || — || September 8, 2004 || Socorro || LINEAR || — || align=right | 1.9 km || 
|-id=617 bgcolor=#E9E9E9
| 416617 ||  || — || September 7, 2004 || Palomar || NEAT || — || align=right | 3.4 km || 
|-id=618 bgcolor=#E9E9E9
| 416618 ||  || — || September 8, 2004 || Palomar || NEAT || — || align=right | 3.3 km || 
|-id=619 bgcolor=#E9E9E9
| 416619 ||  || — || September 8, 2004 || Palomar || NEAT || — || align=right | 3.3 km || 
|-id=620 bgcolor=#fefefe
| 416620 ||  || — || September 11, 2004 || Socorro || LINEAR || — || align=right data-sort-value="0.74" | 740 m || 
|-id=621 bgcolor=#d6d6d6
| 416621 ||  || — || September 10, 2004 || Socorro || LINEAR || — || align=right | 2.9 km || 
|-id=622 bgcolor=#d6d6d6
| 416622 ||  || — || September 10, 2004 || Socorro || LINEAR || BRA || align=right | 1.9 km || 
|-id=623 bgcolor=#fefefe
| 416623 ||  || — || September 10, 2004 || Socorro || LINEAR || — || align=right data-sort-value="0.66" | 660 m || 
|-id=624 bgcolor=#E9E9E9
| 416624 ||  || — || September 11, 2004 || Socorro || LINEAR || — || align=right | 3.5 km || 
|-id=625 bgcolor=#d6d6d6
| 416625 ||  || — || September 9, 2004 || Kitt Peak || Spacewatch || BRA || align=right | 2.0 km || 
|-id=626 bgcolor=#d6d6d6
| 416626 ||  || — || September 9, 2004 || Kitt Peak || Spacewatch || — || align=right | 2.1 km || 
|-id=627 bgcolor=#E9E9E9
| 416627 ||  || — || September 10, 2004 || Kitt Peak || Spacewatch || — || align=right | 1.8 km || 
|-id=628 bgcolor=#E9E9E9
| 416628 ||  || — || July 17, 2004 || Cerro Tololo || M. W. Buie || — || align=right | 2.0 km || 
|-id=629 bgcolor=#E9E9E9
| 416629 ||  || — || September 13, 2004 || Socorro || LINEAR || — || align=right | 2.5 km || 
|-id=630 bgcolor=#E9E9E9
| 416630 ||  || — || September 12, 2004 || Kitt Peak || Spacewatch || — || align=right | 1.5 km || 
|-id=631 bgcolor=#fefefe
| 416631 ||  || — || September 15, 2004 || Anderson Mesa || LONEOS || — || align=right data-sort-value="0.89" | 890 m || 
|-id=632 bgcolor=#fefefe
| 416632 ||  || — || September 11, 2004 || Socorro || LINEAR || — || align=right data-sort-value="0.91" | 910 m || 
|-id=633 bgcolor=#E9E9E9
| 416633 ||  || — || September 14, 2004 || Palomar || NEAT || GEF || align=right | 1.3 km || 
|-id=634 bgcolor=#E9E9E9
| 416634 ||  || — || September 7, 2004 || Socorro || LINEAR || — || align=right | 2.8 km || 
|-id=635 bgcolor=#fefefe
| 416635 ||  || — || September 10, 2004 || Socorro || LINEAR || — || align=right data-sort-value="0.69" | 690 m || 
|-id=636 bgcolor=#E9E9E9
| 416636 ||  || — || September 16, 2004 || Socorro || LINEAR || — || align=right | 3.8 km || 
|-id=637 bgcolor=#E9E9E9
| 416637 ||  || — || September 17, 2004 || Anderson Mesa || LONEOS || — || align=right | 3.1 km || 
|-id=638 bgcolor=#fefefe
| 416638 ||  || — || September 13, 2004 || Anderson Mesa || LONEOS || — || align=right data-sort-value="0.71" | 710 m || 
|-id=639 bgcolor=#E9E9E9
| 416639 ||  || — || October 2, 2004 || Palomar || NEAT || — || align=right | 2.9 km || 
|-id=640 bgcolor=#fefefe
| 416640 ||  || — || October 4, 2004 || Kitt Peak || Spacewatch || — || align=right data-sort-value="0.72" | 720 m || 
|-id=641 bgcolor=#d6d6d6
| 416641 ||  || — || October 4, 2004 || Kitt Peak || Spacewatch || — || align=right | 2.8 km || 
|-id=642 bgcolor=#d6d6d6
| 416642 ||  || — || October 4, 2004 || Kitt Peak || Spacewatch || EOS || align=right | 1.9 km || 
|-id=643 bgcolor=#d6d6d6
| 416643 ||  || — || October 6, 2004 || Kitt Peak || Spacewatch || KOR || align=right | 1.2 km || 
|-id=644 bgcolor=#fefefe
| 416644 ||  || — || October 7, 2004 || Socorro || LINEAR || — || align=right data-sort-value="0.67" | 670 m || 
|-id=645 bgcolor=#fefefe
| 416645 ||  || — || September 23, 2004 || Kitt Peak || Spacewatch || — || align=right data-sort-value="0.63" | 630 m || 
|-id=646 bgcolor=#fefefe
| 416646 ||  || — || October 13, 2001 || Kitt Peak || Spacewatch || — || align=right data-sort-value="0.79" | 790 m || 
|-id=647 bgcolor=#fefefe
| 416647 ||  || — || October 10, 1994 || Kitt Peak || Spacewatch || — || align=right data-sort-value="0.56" | 560 m || 
|-id=648 bgcolor=#E9E9E9
| 416648 ||  || — || October 5, 2004 || Kitt Peak || Spacewatch || — || align=right | 1.9 km || 
|-id=649 bgcolor=#fefefe
| 416649 ||  || — || October 6, 2004 || Kitt Peak || Spacewatch || — || align=right data-sort-value="0.74" | 740 m || 
|-id=650 bgcolor=#E9E9E9
| 416650 ||  || — || October 6, 2004 || Palomar || NEAT || — || align=right | 2.8 km || 
|-id=651 bgcolor=#fefefe
| 416651 ||  || — || September 17, 2004 || Socorro || LINEAR || — || align=right data-sort-value="0.71" | 710 m || 
|-id=652 bgcolor=#d6d6d6
| 416652 ||  || — || October 8, 2004 || Anderson Mesa || LONEOS || — || align=right | 3.0 km || 
|-id=653 bgcolor=#E9E9E9
| 416653 ||  || — || October 6, 2004 || Kitt Peak || Spacewatch || — || align=right | 3.2 km || 
|-id=654 bgcolor=#E9E9E9
| 416654 ||  || — || October 9, 2004 || Socorro || LINEAR || — || align=right | 2.5 km || 
|-id=655 bgcolor=#d6d6d6
| 416655 ||  || — || October 7, 2004 || Kitt Peak || Spacewatch || EOS || align=right | 1.4 km || 
|-id=656 bgcolor=#d6d6d6
| 416656 ||  || — || October 7, 2004 || Kitt Peak || Spacewatch || — || align=right | 1.7 km || 
|-id=657 bgcolor=#fefefe
| 416657 ||  || — || September 9, 2004 || Anderson Mesa || LONEOS || — || align=right data-sort-value="0.74" | 740 m || 
|-id=658 bgcolor=#fefefe
| 416658 ||  || — || October 8, 2004 || Kitt Peak || Spacewatch || — || align=right data-sort-value="0.67" | 670 m || 
|-id=659 bgcolor=#fefefe
| 416659 ||  || — || October 8, 2004 || Kitt Peak || Spacewatch || — || align=right data-sort-value="0.65" | 650 m || 
|-id=660 bgcolor=#E9E9E9
| 416660 ||  || — || October 8, 2004 || Kitt Peak || Spacewatch || HOF || align=right | 2.3 km || 
|-id=661 bgcolor=#d6d6d6
| 416661 ||  || — || October 9, 2004 || Kitt Peak || Spacewatch || — || align=right | 3.2 km || 
|-id=662 bgcolor=#d6d6d6
| 416662 ||  || — || October 9, 2004 || Kitt Peak || Spacewatch || — || align=right | 2.5 km || 
|-id=663 bgcolor=#fefefe
| 416663 ||  || — || October 10, 2004 || Kitt Peak || Spacewatch || — || align=right data-sort-value="0.51" | 510 m || 
|-id=664 bgcolor=#E9E9E9
| 416664 ||  || — || October 4, 2004 || Palomar || NEAT || — || align=right | 2.9 km || 
|-id=665 bgcolor=#d6d6d6
| 416665 ||  || — || October 10, 2004 || Kitt Peak || Spacewatch || — || align=right | 2.3 km || 
|-id=666 bgcolor=#E9E9E9
| 416666 ||  || — || October 10, 2004 || Kitt Peak || Spacewatch || AGN || align=right | 1.4 km || 
|-id=667 bgcolor=#d6d6d6
| 416667 ||  || — || October 7, 2004 || Socorro || LINEAR || — || align=right | 3.3 km || 
|-id=668 bgcolor=#fefefe
| 416668 ||  || — || October 16, 2004 || Socorro || LINEAR || — || align=right | 2.1 km || 
|-id=669 bgcolor=#d6d6d6
| 416669 ||  || — || October 21, 2004 || Socorro || LINEAR || — || align=right | 2.3 km || 
|-id=670 bgcolor=#fefefe
| 416670 ||  || — || October 9, 2004 || Kitt Peak || Spacewatch || — || align=right data-sort-value="0.75" | 750 m || 
|-id=671 bgcolor=#d6d6d6
| 416671 ||  || — || November 4, 2004 || Kitt Peak || Spacewatch || THM || align=right | 1.9 km || 
|-id=672 bgcolor=#E9E9E9
| 416672 ||  || — || October 15, 2004 || Kitt Peak || Spacewatch || — || align=right | 2.9 km || 
|-id=673 bgcolor=#fefefe
| 416673 ||  || — || November 5, 2004 || Palomar || NEAT || H || align=right data-sort-value="0.73" | 730 m || 
|-id=674 bgcolor=#d6d6d6
| 416674 ||  || — || November 9, 2004 || Mauna Kea || C. Veillet || KOR || align=right | 1.0 km || 
|-id=675 bgcolor=#FFC2E0
| 416675 ||  || — || December 3, 2004 || Catalina || CSS || AMO +1kmcritical || align=right | 1.1 km || 
|-id=676 bgcolor=#FA8072
| 416676 ||  || — || December 2, 2004 || Catalina || CSS || — || align=right | 1.1 km || 
|-id=677 bgcolor=#fefefe
| 416677 ||  || — || December 2, 2004 || Desert Moon || B. L. Stevens || — || align=right data-sort-value="0.57" | 570 m || 
|-id=678 bgcolor=#FA8072
| 416678 ||  || — || December 7, 2004 || Socorro || LINEAR || — || align=right | 1.4 km || 
|-id=679 bgcolor=#d6d6d6
| 416679 ||  || — || December 2, 2004 || Catalina || CSS || EOS || align=right | 2.7 km || 
|-id=680 bgcolor=#FFC2E0
| 416680 ||  || — || December 12, 2004 || Socorro || LINEAR || AMO || align=right data-sort-value="0.76" | 760 m || 
|-id=681 bgcolor=#d6d6d6
| 416681 ||  || — || September 20, 2003 || Kitt Peak || Spacewatch || TEL || align=right | 1.3 km || 
|-id=682 bgcolor=#d6d6d6
| 416682 ||  || — || December 10, 2004 || Kitt Peak || Spacewatch || — || align=right | 3.5 km || 
|-id=683 bgcolor=#d6d6d6
| 416683 ||  || — || December 10, 2004 || Kitt Peak || Spacewatch || — || align=right | 3.8 km || 
|-id=684 bgcolor=#d6d6d6
| 416684 ||  || — || December 9, 2004 || Catalina || CSS || — || align=right | 2.9 km || 
|-id=685 bgcolor=#d6d6d6
| 416685 ||  || — || December 11, 2004 || Kitt Peak || Spacewatch || KOR || align=right | 1.4 km || 
|-id=686 bgcolor=#fefefe
| 416686 ||  || — || December 11, 2004 || Kitt Peak || Spacewatch || — || align=right data-sort-value="0.81" | 810 m || 
|-id=687 bgcolor=#d6d6d6
| 416687 ||  || — || November 11, 2004 || Kitt Peak || Spacewatch || KOR || align=right | 2.1 km || 
|-id=688 bgcolor=#d6d6d6
| 416688 ||  || — || December 15, 2004 || Kitt Peak || Spacewatch || — || align=right | 2.7 km || 
|-id=689 bgcolor=#fefefe
| 416689 ||  || — || December 15, 2004 || Needville || Needville Obs. || — || align=right data-sort-value="0.95" | 950 m || 
|-id=690 bgcolor=#fefefe
| 416690 ||  || — || December 14, 2004 || Kitt Peak || Spacewatch || (2076) || align=right data-sort-value="0.84" | 840 m || 
|-id=691 bgcolor=#fefefe
| 416691 ||  || — || December 18, 2004 || Mount Lemmon || Mount Lemmon Survey || — || align=right data-sort-value="0.70" | 700 m || 
|-id=692 bgcolor=#d6d6d6
| 416692 ||  || — || December 18, 2004 || Mount Lemmon || Mount Lemmon Survey || EOS || align=right | 3.9 km || 
|-id=693 bgcolor=#C2FFFF
| 416693 ||  || — || December 18, 2004 || Mount Lemmon || Mount Lemmon Survey || L5 || align=right | 12 km || 
|-id=694 bgcolor=#FFC2E0
| 416694 ||  || — || December 22, 2004 || Catalina || CSS || APO +1km || align=right | 2.3 km || 
|-id=695 bgcolor=#fefefe
| 416695 ||  || — || January 6, 2005 || Socorro || LINEAR || — || align=right data-sort-value="0.73" | 730 m || 
|-id=696 bgcolor=#d6d6d6
| 416696 ||  || — || January 6, 2005 || Catalina || CSS || — || align=right | 3.8 km || 
|-id=697 bgcolor=#d6d6d6
| 416697 ||  || — || January 6, 2005 || Socorro || LINEAR || — || align=right | 2.2 km || 
|-id=698 bgcolor=#fefefe
| 416698 ||  || — || December 13, 2004 || Kitt Peak || Spacewatch || H || align=right data-sort-value="0.77" | 770 m || 
|-id=699 bgcolor=#d6d6d6
| 416699 ||  || — || January 13, 2005 || Kitt Peak || Spacewatch || — || align=right | 3.4 km || 
|-id=700 bgcolor=#E9E9E9
| 416700 ||  || — || December 20, 2004 || Mount Lemmon || Mount Lemmon Survey || — || align=right | 3.1 km || 
|}

416701–416800 

|-bgcolor=#fefefe
| 416701 ||  || — || January 15, 2005 || Kitt Peak || Spacewatch || — || align=right data-sort-value="0.68" | 680 m || 
|-id=702 bgcolor=#fefefe
| 416702 ||  || — || January 13, 2005 || Kitt Peak || Spacewatch || — || align=right data-sort-value="0.57" | 570 m || 
|-id=703 bgcolor=#d6d6d6
| 416703 ||  || — || January 15, 2005 || Socorro || LINEAR || — || align=right | 3.6 km || 
|-id=704 bgcolor=#fefefe
| 416704 ||  || — || December 19, 2004 || Mount Lemmon || Mount Lemmon Survey || — || align=right data-sort-value="0.59" | 590 m || 
|-id=705 bgcolor=#C2FFFF
| 416705 ||  || — || January 13, 2005 || Kitt Peak || Spacewatch || L5 || align=right | 8.8 km || 
|-id=706 bgcolor=#d6d6d6
| 416706 ||  || — || January 13, 2005 || Kitt Peak || Spacewatch || — || align=right | 2.0 km || 
|-id=707 bgcolor=#FA8072
| 416707 ||  || — || December 14, 2004 || Socorro || LINEAR || — || align=right data-sort-value="0.59" | 590 m || 
|-id=708 bgcolor=#C2FFFF
| 416708 ||  || — || January 15, 2005 || Kitt Peak || Spacewatch || L5 || align=right | 13 km || 
|-id=709 bgcolor=#d6d6d6
| 416709 ||  || — || January 15, 2005 || Kitt Peak || Spacewatch || — || align=right | 2.4 km || 
|-id=710 bgcolor=#fefefe
| 416710 ||  || — || January 16, 2005 || Socorro || LINEAR || — || align=right data-sort-value="0.59" | 590 m || 
|-id=711 bgcolor=#d6d6d6
| 416711 ||  || — || January 16, 2005 || Kitt Peak || Spacewatch || — || align=right | 3.3 km || 
|-id=712 bgcolor=#fefefe
| 416712 ||  || — || January 17, 2005 || Kitt Peak || Spacewatch || H || align=right data-sort-value="0.76" | 760 m || 
|-id=713 bgcolor=#C2FFFF
| 416713 ||  || — || December 20, 2004 || Mount Lemmon || Mount Lemmon Survey || L5 || align=right | 10 km || 
|-id=714 bgcolor=#d6d6d6
| 416714 ||  || — || January 16, 2005 || Mauna Kea || C. Veillet || EOS || align=right | 2.2 km || 
|-id=715 bgcolor=#fefefe
| 416715 ||  || — || January 17, 2005 || Kitt Peak || Spacewatch || — || align=right data-sort-value="0.84" | 840 m || 
|-id=716 bgcolor=#d6d6d6
| 416716 ||  || — || February 1, 2005 || Kitt Peak || Spacewatch || — || align=right | 2.6 km || 
|-id=717 bgcolor=#fefefe
| 416717 ||  || — || February 1, 2005 || Catalina || CSS || — || align=right data-sort-value="0.86" | 860 m || 
|-id=718 bgcolor=#fefefe
| 416718 ||  || — || February 2, 2005 || Kitt Peak || Spacewatch || V || align=right data-sort-value="0.74" | 740 m || 
|-id=719 bgcolor=#d6d6d6
| 416719 ||  || — || February 2, 2005 || Catalina || CSS || — || align=right | 3.8 km || 
|-id=720 bgcolor=#d6d6d6
| 416720 ||  || — || February 2, 2005 || Socorro || LINEAR || — || align=right | 3.8 km || 
|-id=721 bgcolor=#fefefe
| 416721 ||  || — || February 9, 2005 || Kitt Peak || Spacewatch || — || align=right data-sort-value="0.73" | 730 m || 
|-id=722 bgcolor=#d6d6d6
| 416722 ||  || — || February 1, 2005 || Kitt Peak || Spacewatch || — || align=right | 4.5 km || 
|-id=723 bgcolor=#d6d6d6
| 416723 ||  || — || February 3, 2005 || Socorro || LINEAR || — || align=right | 4.2 km || 
|-id=724 bgcolor=#d6d6d6
| 416724 ||  || — || February 3, 2005 || Socorro || LINEAR || — || align=right | 4.7 km || 
|-id=725 bgcolor=#fefefe
| 416725 ||  || — || February 14, 2005 || Socorro || LINEAR || — || align=right data-sort-value="0.77" | 770 m || 
|-id=726 bgcolor=#d6d6d6
| 416726 ||  || — || February 14, 2005 || Catalina || CSS || — || align=right | 3.0 km || 
|-id=727 bgcolor=#d6d6d6
| 416727 ||  || — || February 1, 2005 || Kitt Peak || Spacewatch || — || align=right | 3.5 km || 
|-id=728 bgcolor=#fefefe
| 416728 ||  || — || February 2, 2005 || Palomar || NEAT || — || align=right data-sort-value="0.80" | 800 m || 
|-id=729 bgcolor=#fefefe
| 416729 ||  || — || February 28, 2005 || Socorro || LINEAR || H || align=right data-sort-value="0.96" | 960 m || 
|-id=730 bgcolor=#fefefe
| 416730 ||  || — || March 2, 2005 || Catalina || CSS || H || align=right data-sort-value="0.91" | 910 m || 
|-id=731 bgcolor=#d6d6d6
| 416731 ||  || — || March 2, 2005 || Kitt Peak || Spacewatch || — || align=right | 2.5 km || 
|-id=732 bgcolor=#d6d6d6
| 416732 ||  || — || March 3, 2005 || Kitt Peak || Spacewatch || THM || align=right | 1.9 km || 
|-id=733 bgcolor=#fefefe
| 416733 ||  || — || March 3, 2005 || Catalina || CSS || — || align=right data-sort-value="0.96" | 960 m || 
|-id=734 bgcolor=#fefefe
| 416734 ||  || — || March 1, 2005 || Kitt Peak || Spacewatch || — || align=right data-sort-value="0.91" | 910 m || 
|-id=735 bgcolor=#fefefe
| 416735 ||  || — || March 3, 2005 || Catalina || CSS || — || align=right data-sort-value="0.94" | 940 m || 
|-id=736 bgcolor=#d6d6d6
| 416736 ||  || — || March 3, 2005 || Kitt Peak || Spacewatch || EOS || align=right | 2.1 km || 
|-id=737 bgcolor=#d6d6d6
| 416737 ||  || — || March 3, 2005 || Catalina || CSS || — || align=right | 3.2 km || 
|-id=738 bgcolor=#d6d6d6
| 416738 ||  || — || March 4, 2005 || Kitt Peak || Spacewatch || — || align=right | 3.1 km || 
|-id=739 bgcolor=#d6d6d6
| 416739 ||  || — || March 4, 2005 || Kitt Peak || Spacewatch || — || align=right | 2.9 km || 
|-id=740 bgcolor=#fefefe
| 416740 ||  || — || March 4, 2005 || Mount Lemmon || Mount Lemmon Survey || — || align=right data-sort-value="0.83" | 830 m || 
|-id=741 bgcolor=#FA8072
| 416741 ||  || — || March 8, 2005 || Catalina || CSS || — || align=right | 1.6 km || 
|-id=742 bgcolor=#fefefe
| 416742 ||  || — || February 1, 2005 || Catalina || CSS || H || align=right data-sort-value="0.98" | 980 m || 
|-id=743 bgcolor=#d6d6d6
| 416743 ||  || — || March 3, 2005 || Kitt Peak || Spacewatch || — || align=right | 3.7 km || 
|-id=744 bgcolor=#d6d6d6
| 416744 ||  || — || March 4, 2005 || Catalina || CSS || — || align=right | 4.9 km || 
|-id=745 bgcolor=#d6d6d6
| 416745 ||  || — || March 8, 2005 || Socorro || LINEAR || — || align=right | 3.2 km || 
|-id=746 bgcolor=#d6d6d6
| 416746 ||  || — || March 8, 2005 || Socorro || LINEAR || — || align=right | 3.7 km || 
|-id=747 bgcolor=#fefefe
| 416747 ||  || — || March 3, 2005 || Catalina || CSS || — || align=right data-sort-value="0.74" | 740 m || 
|-id=748 bgcolor=#fefefe
| 416748 ||  || — || March 4, 2005 || Mount Lemmon || Mount Lemmon Survey || — || align=right data-sort-value="0.80" | 800 m || 
|-id=749 bgcolor=#fefefe
| 416749 ||  || — || January 17, 2005 || Kitt Peak || Spacewatch || — || align=right data-sort-value="0.64" | 640 m || 
|-id=750 bgcolor=#fefefe
| 416750 ||  || — || March 4, 2005 || Mount Lemmon || Mount Lemmon Survey || — || align=right data-sort-value="0.88" | 880 m || 
|-id=751 bgcolor=#d6d6d6
| 416751 ||  || — || March 4, 2005 || Mount Lemmon || Mount Lemmon Survey || — || align=right | 3.3 km || 
|-id=752 bgcolor=#fefefe
| 416752 ||  || — || March 8, 2005 || Mount Lemmon || Mount Lemmon Survey || — || align=right data-sort-value="0.73" | 730 m || 
|-id=753 bgcolor=#fefefe
| 416753 ||  || — || March 9, 2005 || Anderson Mesa || LONEOS || — || align=right data-sort-value="0.79" | 790 m || 
|-id=754 bgcolor=#d6d6d6
| 416754 ||  || — || March 9, 2005 || Mount Lemmon || Mount Lemmon Survey || HYG || align=right | 2.6 km || 
|-id=755 bgcolor=#d6d6d6
| 416755 ||  || — || March 10, 2005 || Catalina || CSS || LIX || align=right | 4.2 km || 
|-id=756 bgcolor=#fefefe
| 416756 ||  || — || March 10, 2005 || Mount Lemmon || Mount Lemmon Survey || — || align=right data-sort-value="0.76" | 760 m || 
|-id=757 bgcolor=#fefefe
| 416757 ||  || — || March 10, 2005 || Kitt Peak || Spacewatch || — || align=right data-sort-value="0.93" | 930 m || 
|-id=758 bgcolor=#d6d6d6
| 416758 ||  || — || March 8, 2005 || Mount Lemmon || Mount Lemmon Survey || — || align=right | 3.0 km || 
|-id=759 bgcolor=#fefefe
| 416759 ||  || — || March 1, 2005 || Catalina || CSS || — || align=right | 1.4 km || 
|-id=760 bgcolor=#fefefe
| 416760 ||  || — || March 11, 2005 || Mount Lemmon || Mount Lemmon Survey || — || align=right data-sort-value="0.67" | 670 m || 
|-id=761 bgcolor=#d6d6d6
| 416761 ||  || — || March 12, 2005 || Siding Spring || SSS || — || align=right | 5.5 km || 
|-id=762 bgcolor=#fefefe
| 416762 ||  || — || March 8, 2005 || Catalina || CSS || H || align=right data-sort-value="0.68" | 680 m || 
|-id=763 bgcolor=#d6d6d6
| 416763 ||  || — || March 7, 2005 || Socorro || LINEAR || — || align=right | 2.0 km || 
|-id=764 bgcolor=#d6d6d6
| 416764 ||  || — || March 8, 2005 || Mount Lemmon || Mount Lemmon Survey || — || align=right | 2.1 km || 
|-id=765 bgcolor=#fefefe
| 416765 ||  || — || March 10, 2005 || Anderson Mesa || LONEOS || — || align=right data-sort-value="0.89" | 890 m || 
|-id=766 bgcolor=#fefefe
| 416766 ||  || — || March 10, 2005 || Anderson Mesa || LONEOS || — || align=right data-sort-value="0.85" | 850 m || 
|-id=767 bgcolor=#d6d6d6
| 416767 ||  || — || March 10, 2005 || Anderson Mesa || LONEOS || — || align=right | 4.0 km || 
|-id=768 bgcolor=#fefefe
| 416768 ||  || — || March 3, 2005 || Catalina || CSS || — || align=right data-sort-value="0.84" | 840 m || 
|-id=769 bgcolor=#d6d6d6
| 416769 ||  || — || March 11, 2005 || Kitt Peak || Spacewatch || — || align=right | 2.8 km || 
|-id=770 bgcolor=#d6d6d6
| 416770 ||  || — || March 3, 2005 || Kitt Peak || Spacewatch || — || align=right | 4.1 km || 
|-id=771 bgcolor=#fefefe
| 416771 ||  || — || March 12, 2005 || Kitt Peak || Spacewatch || NYS || align=right data-sort-value="0.60" | 600 m || 
|-id=772 bgcolor=#C2FFFF
| 416772 ||  || — || January 17, 2005 || Kitt Peak || Spacewatch || L5 || align=right | 8.4 km || 
|-id=773 bgcolor=#fefefe
| 416773 ||  || — || March 8, 2005 || Anderson Mesa || LONEOS || — || align=right data-sort-value="0.75" | 750 m || 
|-id=774 bgcolor=#d6d6d6
| 416774 ||  || — || March 4, 2005 || Catalina || CSS || — || align=right | 3.8 km || 
|-id=775 bgcolor=#d6d6d6
| 416775 ||  || — || March 9, 2005 || Kitt Peak || Spacewatch || EOS || align=right | 1.6 km || 
|-id=776 bgcolor=#C2FFFF
| 416776 ||  || — || November 17, 2001 || Kitt Peak || Spacewatch || L5 || align=right | 8.0 km || 
|-id=777 bgcolor=#d6d6d6
| 416777 ||  || — || March 10, 2005 || Kitt Peak || M. W. Buie || — || align=right | 2.2 km || 
|-id=778 bgcolor=#d6d6d6
| 416778 ||  || — || March 30, 2005 || Siding Spring || SSS || — || align=right | 4.2 km || 
|-id=779 bgcolor=#d6d6d6
| 416779 ||  || — || April 1, 2005 || Anderson Mesa || LONEOS || Tj (2.98) || align=right | 3.4 km || 
|-id=780 bgcolor=#fefefe
| 416780 ||  || — || April 1, 2005 || Siding Spring || SSS || H || align=right | 1.0 km || 
|-id=781 bgcolor=#d6d6d6
| 416781 ||  || — || April 1, 2005 || Anderson Mesa || LONEOS || — || align=right | 2.6 km || 
|-id=782 bgcolor=#d6d6d6
| 416782 ||  || — || April 2, 2005 || Mount Lemmon || Mount Lemmon Survey || Tj (2.99) || align=right | 3.9 km || 
|-id=783 bgcolor=#d6d6d6
| 416783 ||  || — || April 2, 2005 || Catalina || CSS || — || align=right | 3.1 km || 
|-id=784 bgcolor=#d6d6d6
| 416784 ||  || — || April 1, 2005 || Kitt Peak || Spacewatch || — || align=right | 4.8 km || 
|-id=785 bgcolor=#d6d6d6
| 416785 ||  || — || April 2, 2005 || Palomar || NEAT || — || align=right | 2.8 km || 
|-id=786 bgcolor=#fefefe
| 416786 ||  || — || April 4, 2005 || Socorro || LINEAR || — || align=right | 1.0 km || 
|-id=787 bgcolor=#fefefe
| 416787 ||  || — || March 14, 2005 || Mount Lemmon || Mount Lemmon Survey || MAS || align=right data-sort-value="0.71" | 710 m || 
|-id=788 bgcolor=#d6d6d6
| 416788 ||  || — || April 2, 2005 || Mount Lemmon || Mount Lemmon Survey || — || align=right | 2.5 km || 
|-id=789 bgcolor=#d6d6d6
| 416789 ||  || — || April 2, 2005 || Catalina || CSS || — || align=right | 4.4 km || 
|-id=790 bgcolor=#d6d6d6
| 416790 ||  || — || April 2, 2005 || Catalina || CSS || — || align=right | 5.1 km || 
|-id=791 bgcolor=#d6d6d6
| 416791 ||  || — || April 4, 2005 || Mount Lemmon || Mount Lemmon Survey || — || align=right | 2.2 km || 
|-id=792 bgcolor=#d6d6d6
| 416792 ||  || — || March 30, 2000 || Kitt Peak || Spacewatch || — || align=right | 2.3 km || 
|-id=793 bgcolor=#fefefe
| 416793 ||  || — || March 14, 2005 || Mount Lemmon || Mount Lemmon Survey || NYS || align=right data-sort-value="0.54" | 540 m || 
|-id=794 bgcolor=#fefefe
| 416794 ||  || — || April 4, 2005 || Kitt Peak || Spacewatch || — || align=right data-sort-value="0.82" | 820 m || 
|-id=795 bgcolor=#fefefe
| 416795 ||  || — || April 5, 2005 || Mount Lemmon || Mount Lemmon Survey || — || align=right data-sort-value="0.97" | 970 m || 
|-id=796 bgcolor=#d6d6d6
| 416796 ||  || — || April 6, 2005 || Kitt Peak || Spacewatch || — || align=right | 3.5 km || 
|-id=797 bgcolor=#d6d6d6
| 416797 ||  || — || April 7, 2005 || Palomar || NEAT || — || align=right | 4.9 km || 
|-id=798 bgcolor=#d6d6d6
| 416798 ||  || — || April 7, 2005 || Palomar || NEAT || — || align=right | 2.1 km || 
|-id=799 bgcolor=#fefefe
| 416799 ||  || — || April 10, 2005 || Kitt Peak || Spacewatch || — || align=right data-sort-value="0.92" | 920 m || 
|-id=800 bgcolor=#d6d6d6
| 416800 ||  || — || April 6, 2005 || Catalina || CSS || — || align=right | 4.3 km || 
|}

416801–416900 

|-bgcolor=#FFC2E0
| 416801 ||  || — || April 12, 2005 || Catalina || CSS || APOPHA || align=right data-sort-value="0.91" | 910 m || 
|-id=802 bgcolor=#d6d6d6
| 416802 ||  || — || April 9, 2005 || Catalina || CSS || — || align=right | 5.3 km || 
|-id=803 bgcolor=#FA8072
| 416803 ||  || — || April 9, 2005 || Socorro || LINEAR || — || align=right data-sort-value="0.79" | 790 m || 
|-id=804 bgcolor=#FFC2E0
| 416804 ||  || — || March 9, 2005 || Mount Lemmon || Mount Lemmon Survey || AMOcritical || align=right data-sort-value="0.68" | 680 m || 
|-id=805 bgcolor=#d6d6d6
| 416805 ||  || — || April 12, 2005 || Mount Lemmon || Mount Lemmon Survey || — || align=right | 3.9 km || 
|-id=806 bgcolor=#fefefe
| 416806 ||  || — || April 10, 2005 || Kitt Peak || Spacewatch || H || align=right data-sort-value="0.52" | 520 m || 
|-id=807 bgcolor=#d6d6d6
| 416807 ||  || — || April 11, 2005 || Kitt Peak || Spacewatch || — || align=right | 2.8 km || 
|-id=808 bgcolor=#fefefe
| 416808 ||  || — || April 11, 2005 || Mount Lemmon || Mount Lemmon Survey || NYS || align=right data-sort-value="0.65" | 650 m || 
|-id=809 bgcolor=#fefefe
| 416809 ||  || — || April 4, 2005 || Catalina || CSS || — || align=right data-sort-value="0.80" | 800 m || 
|-id=810 bgcolor=#fefefe
| 416810 ||  || — || March 9, 2005 || Mount Lemmon || Mount Lemmon Survey || — || align=right data-sort-value="0.75" | 750 m || 
|-id=811 bgcolor=#d6d6d6
| 416811 ||  || — || March 11, 2005 || Mount Lemmon || Mount Lemmon Survey || — || align=right | 3.0 km || 
|-id=812 bgcolor=#d6d6d6
| 416812 ||  || — || April 15, 2005 || Siding Spring || SSS || — || align=right | 4.6 km || 
|-id=813 bgcolor=#d6d6d6
| 416813 ||  || — || April 13, 2005 || Catalina || CSS || — || align=right | 4.1 km || 
|-id=814 bgcolor=#d6d6d6
| 416814 ||  || — || March 4, 2005 || Mount Lemmon || Mount Lemmon Survey || — || align=right | 2.2 km || 
|-id=815 bgcolor=#fefefe
| 416815 ||  || — || March 4, 2005 || Mount Lemmon || Mount Lemmon Survey || — || align=right | 1.1 km || 
|-id=816 bgcolor=#fefefe
| 416816 ||  || — || April 5, 2005 || Mount Lemmon || Mount Lemmon Survey || V || align=right data-sort-value="0.64" | 640 m || 
|-id=817 bgcolor=#d6d6d6
| 416817 ||  || — || April 4, 2005 || Mount Lemmon || Mount Lemmon Survey || — || align=right | 3.1 km || 
|-id=818 bgcolor=#fefefe
| 416818 ||  || — || April 8, 2005 || Socorro || LINEAR || — || align=right | 1.1 km || 
|-id=819 bgcolor=#d6d6d6
| 416819 ||  || — || April 1, 2005 || Kitt Peak || Spacewatch || Tj (2.99) || align=right | 3.0 km || 
|-id=820 bgcolor=#d6d6d6
| 416820 ||  || — || April 15, 2005 || Catalina || CSS || — || align=right | 3.9 km || 
|-id=821 bgcolor=#d6d6d6
| 416821 ||  || — || April 30, 2005 || Kitt Peak || Spacewatch || — || align=right | 3.7 km || 
|-id=822 bgcolor=#fefefe
| 416822 ||  || — || April 17, 2005 || Catalina || CSS || H || align=right data-sort-value="0.98" | 980 m || 
|-id=823 bgcolor=#fefefe
| 416823 ||  || — || April 17, 2005 || Kitt Peak || Spacewatch || — || align=right | 1.0 km || 
|-id=824 bgcolor=#E9E9E9
| 416824 ||  || — || May 4, 2005 || Mount Lemmon || Mount Lemmon Survey || — || align=right data-sort-value="0.75" | 750 m || 
|-id=825 bgcolor=#d6d6d6
| 416825 ||  || — || May 4, 2005 || Socorro || LINEAR || — || align=right | 5.1 km || 
|-id=826 bgcolor=#fefefe
| 416826 ||  || — || May 4, 2005 || Kitt Peak || Spacewatch || — || align=right data-sort-value="0.96" | 960 m || 
|-id=827 bgcolor=#fefefe
| 416827 ||  || — || May 3, 2005 || Kitt Peak || DLS || H || align=right data-sort-value="0.85" | 850 m || 
|-id=828 bgcolor=#fefefe
| 416828 ||  || — || May 8, 2005 || Kitt Peak || Spacewatch || — || align=right data-sort-value="0.91" | 910 m || 
|-id=829 bgcolor=#d6d6d6
| 416829 ||  || — || May 9, 2005 || Anderson Mesa || LONEOS || — || align=right | 4.7 km || 
|-id=830 bgcolor=#E9E9E9
| 416830 ||  || — || May 12, 2005 || Mayhill || A. Lowe || — || align=right | 2.5 km || 
|-id=831 bgcolor=#fefefe
| 416831 ||  || — || May 9, 2005 || Kitt Peak || Spacewatch || — || align=right | 1.9 km || 
|-id=832 bgcolor=#d6d6d6
| 416832 ||  || — || April 30, 2005 || Kitt Peak || Spacewatch || EOS || align=right | 2.2 km || 
|-id=833 bgcolor=#fefefe
| 416833 ||  || — || May 9, 2005 || Kitt Peak || Spacewatch || — || align=right | 1.1 km || 
|-id=834 bgcolor=#d6d6d6
| 416834 ||  || — || May 6, 2005 || Kitt Peak || DLS || — || align=right | 2.8 km || 
|-id=835 bgcolor=#d6d6d6
| 416835 ||  || — || May 6, 2005 || Kitt Peak || DLS || Tj (2.99) || align=right | 5.4 km || 
|-id=836 bgcolor=#d6d6d6
| 416836 ||  || — || May 9, 2005 || Anderson Mesa || LONEOS || — || align=right | 4.8 km || 
|-id=837 bgcolor=#FA8072
| 416837 ||  || — || May 14, 2005 || Mount Lemmon || Mount Lemmon Survey || — || align=right data-sort-value="0.97" | 970 m || 
|-id=838 bgcolor=#E9E9E9
| 416838 ||  || — || May 15, 2005 || Palomar || NEAT || — || align=right | 1.9 km || 
|-id=839 bgcolor=#fefefe
| 416839 ||  || — || May 3, 2005 || Kitt Peak || Spacewatch || — || align=right data-sort-value="0.78" | 780 m || 
|-id=840 bgcolor=#d6d6d6
| 416840 ||  || — || May 9, 2005 || Kitt Peak || Spacewatch || — || align=right | 3.5 km || 
|-id=841 bgcolor=#E9E9E9
| 416841 ||  || — || June 1, 2005 || Mount Lemmon || Mount Lemmon Survey || — || align=right | 1.1 km || 
|-id=842 bgcolor=#E9E9E9
| 416842 ||  || — || May 18, 2005 || Palomar || NEAT || — || align=right | 1.4 km || 
|-id=843 bgcolor=#FA8072
| 416843 ||  || — || June 11, 2005 || Mayhill || A. Lowe || — || align=right | 1.00 km || 
|-id=844 bgcolor=#E9E9E9
| 416844 ||  || — || June 6, 2005 || Kitt Peak || Spacewatch || — || align=right | 1.1 km || 
|-id=845 bgcolor=#d6d6d6
| 416845 ||  || — || May 11, 2005 || Mount Lemmon || Mount Lemmon Survey || — || align=right | 3.5 km || 
|-id=846 bgcolor=#fefefe
| 416846 ||  || — || April 30, 2005 || Kitt Peak || Spacewatch || — || align=right data-sort-value="0.86" | 860 m || 
|-id=847 bgcolor=#E9E9E9
| 416847 ||  || — || May 15, 2005 || Mount Lemmon || Mount Lemmon Survey || — || align=right | 1.2 km || 
|-id=848 bgcolor=#fefefe
| 416848 ||  || — || June 2, 2005 || Siding Spring || SSS || H || align=right data-sort-value="0.81" | 810 m || 
|-id=849 bgcolor=#E9E9E9
| 416849 ||  || — || June 24, 2005 || Palomar || NEAT || EUN || align=right | 1.2 km || 
|-id=850 bgcolor=#fefefe
| 416850 ||  || — || June 16, 2005 || Mount Lemmon || Mount Lemmon Survey || — || align=right data-sort-value="0.96" | 960 m || 
|-id=851 bgcolor=#FFC2E0
| 416851 ||  || — || June 29, 2005 || Palomar || NEAT || AMO || align=right data-sort-value="0.57" | 570 m || 
|-id=852 bgcolor=#fefefe
| 416852 ||  || — || June 25, 2005 || Palomar || NEAT || H || align=right data-sort-value="0.84" | 840 m || 
|-id=853 bgcolor=#fefefe
| 416853 ||  || — || June 27, 2005 || Kitt Peak || Spacewatch || — || align=right data-sort-value="0.99" | 990 m || 
|-id=854 bgcolor=#E9E9E9
| 416854 ||  || — || June 27, 2005 || Kitt Peak || Spacewatch || RAF || align=right data-sort-value="0.92" | 920 m || 
|-id=855 bgcolor=#E9E9E9
| 416855 ||  || — || June 27, 2005 || Kitt Peak || Spacewatch || — || align=right | 1.2 km || 
|-id=856 bgcolor=#fefefe
| 416856 ||  || — || June 24, 2005 || Palomar || NEAT || H || align=right data-sort-value="0.86" | 860 m || 
|-id=857 bgcolor=#d6d6d6
| 416857 ||  || — || July 5, 2005 || Kitt Peak || Spacewatch || SHU3:2 || align=right | 5.5 km || 
|-id=858 bgcolor=#fefefe
| 416858 ||  || — || July 5, 2005 || Mount Lemmon || Mount Lemmon Survey || ERI || align=right | 1.6 km || 
|-id=859 bgcolor=#E9E9E9
| 416859 ||  || — || July 4, 2005 || Mount Lemmon || Mount Lemmon Survey || — || align=right data-sort-value="0.98" | 980 m || 
|-id=860 bgcolor=#E9E9E9
| 416860 ||  || — || July 4, 2005 || Kitt Peak || Spacewatch || — || align=right | 1.3 km || 
|-id=861 bgcolor=#d6d6d6
| 416861 ||  || — || July 6, 2005 || Kitt Peak || Spacewatch || 3:2 || align=right | 3.7 km || 
|-id=862 bgcolor=#d6d6d6
| 416862 ||  || — || June 15, 2005 || Mount Lemmon || Mount Lemmon Survey || 3:2 || align=right | 4.1 km || 
|-id=863 bgcolor=#E9E9E9
| 416863 ||  || — || July 3, 2005 || Mount Lemmon || Mount Lemmon Survey || — || align=right | 1.2 km || 
|-id=864 bgcolor=#E9E9E9
| 416864 ||  || — || July 3, 2005 || Mount Lemmon || Mount Lemmon Survey || — || align=right | 1.0 km || 
|-id=865 bgcolor=#fefefe
| 416865 ||  || — || July 4, 2005 || Kitt Peak || Spacewatch || H || align=right data-sort-value="0.79" | 790 m || 
|-id=866 bgcolor=#E9E9E9
| 416866 ||  || — || July 5, 2005 || Kitt Peak || Spacewatch || — || align=right data-sort-value="0.96" | 960 m || 
|-id=867 bgcolor=#d6d6d6
| 416867 ||  || — || July 6, 2005 || Campo Imperatore || CINEOS || — || align=right | 5.1 km || 
|-id=868 bgcolor=#fefefe
| 416868 ||  || — || July 11, 2005 || Catalina || CSS || H || align=right data-sort-value="0.96" | 960 m || 
|-id=869 bgcolor=#E9E9E9
| 416869 ||  || — || July 19, 2005 || Palomar || NEAT || JUN || align=right | 1.1 km || 
|-id=870 bgcolor=#E9E9E9
| 416870 ||  || — || July 29, 2005 || Palomar || NEAT || — || align=right | 1.6 km || 
|-id=871 bgcolor=#E9E9E9
| 416871 ||  || — || July 30, 2005 || Palomar || NEAT || — || align=right | 1.7 km || 
|-id=872 bgcolor=#E9E9E9
| 416872 ||  || — || July 29, 2005 || Anderson Mesa || LONEOS || EUN || align=right | 1.4 km || 
|-id=873 bgcolor=#E9E9E9
| 416873 ||  || — || July 26, 2005 || Palomar || NEAT || MAR || align=right | 1.5 km || 
|-id=874 bgcolor=#E9E9E9
| 416874 ||  || — || August 6, 2005 || Palomar || NEAT || — || align=right | 1.2 km || 
|-id=875 bgcolor=#E9E9E9
| 416875 ||  || — || August 8, 2005 || Cerro Tololo || M. W. Buie || — || align=right | 1.5 km || 
|-id=876 bgcolor=#E9E9E9
| 416876 ||  || — || June 17, 2005 || Mount Lemmon || Mount Lemmon Survey || — || align=right | 2.0 km || 
|-id=877 bgcolor=#E9E9E9
| 416877 ||  || — || August 1, 2005 || Siding Spring || SSS || — || align=right | 1.7 km || 
|-id=878 bgcolor=#E9E9E9
| 416878 ||  || — || August 3, 2005 || Socorro || LINEAR || — || align=right | 2.3 km || 
|-id=879 bgcolor=#E9E9E9
| 416879 ||  || — || August 24, 2005 || Palomar || NEAT || ADE || align=right | 1.8 km || 
|-id=880 bgcolor=#E9E9E9
| 416880 ||  || — || August 26, 2005 || Palomar || NEAT || — || align=right data-sort-value="0.97" | 970 m || 
|-id=881 bgcolor=#E9E9E9
| 416881 ||  || — || August 28, 2005 || Kitt Peak || Spacewatch || — || align=right | 1.2 km || 
|-id=882 bgcolor=#E9E9E9
| 416882 ||  || — || August 23, 2005 || Haleakala || NEAT || — || align=right | 2.1 km || 
|-id=883 bgcolor=#E9E9E9
| 416883 ||  || — || August 26, 2005 || Palomar || NEAT || (5) || align=right data-sort-value="0.94" | 940 m || 
|-id=884 bgcolor=#E9E9E9
| 416884 ||  || — || August 27, 2005 || Anderson Mesa || LONEOS || — || align=right | 2.0 km || 
|-id=885 bgcolor=#E9E9E9
| 416885 ||  || — || August 28, 2005 || Anderson Mesa || LONEOS || — || align=right data-sort-value="0.87" | 870 m || 
|-id=886 bgcolor=#E9E9E9
| 416886 ||  || — || August 29, 2005 || Anderson Mesa || LONEOS || — || align=right data-sort-value="0.99" | 990 m || 
|-id=887 bgcolor=#E9E9E9
| 416887 ||  || — || August 29, 2005 || Socorro || LINEAR || — || align=right | 1.7 km || 
|-id=888 bgcolor=#fefefe
| 416888 ||  || — || August 27, 2005 || Palomar || NEAT || V || align=right data-sort-value="0.78" | 780 m || 
|-id=889 bgcolor=#d6d6d6
| 416889 ||  || — || August 28, 2005 || Kitt Peak || Spacewatch || 3:2 || align=right | 3.7 km || 
|-id=890 bgcolor=#E9E9E9
| 416890 ||  || — || August 28, 2005 || Kitt Peak || Spacewatch || — || align=right | 1.2 km || 
|-id=891 bgcolor=#E9E9E9
| 416891 ||  || — || August 28, 2005 || Kitt Peak || Spacewatch || — || align=right | 1.6 km || 
|-id=892 bgcolor=#E9E9E9
| 416892 ||  || — || August 28, 2005 || Kitt Peak || Spacewatch || — || align=right | 1.6 km || 
|-id=893 bgcolor=#E9E9E9
| 416893 ||  || — || August 27, 2005 || Palomar || NEAT || — || align=right | 1.2 km || 
|-id=894 bgcolor=#E9E9E9
| 416894 ||  || — || August 27, 2005 || Kitt Peak || Spacewatch || — || align=right | 1.5 km || 
|-id=895 bgcolor=#E9E9E9
| 416895 ||  || — || August 27, 2005 || Palomar || NEAT || — || align=right | 2.4 km || 
|-id=896 bgcolor=#E9E9E9
| 416896 ||  || — || August 30, 2005 || Palomar || NEAT || — || align=right | 1.3 km || 
|-id=897 bgcolor=#E9E9E9
| 416897 ||  || — || August 30, 2005 || Palomar || NEAT || JUN || align=right | 1.2 km || 
|-id=898 bgcolor=#E9E9E9
| 416898 ||  || — || August 26, 2005 || Anderson Mesa || LONEOS || — || align=right | 1.2 km || 
|-id=899 bgcolor=#E9E9E9
| 416899 ||  || — || August 29, 2005 || Palomar || NEAT || JUN || align=right | 1.1 km || 
|-id=900 bgcolor=#E9E9E9
| 416900 ||  || — || August 29, 2005 || Palomar || NEAT || — || align=right | 1.7 km || 
|}

416901–417000 

|-bgcolor=#E9E9E9
| 416901 ||  || — || August 29, 2005 || Palomar || NEAT || — || align=right | 1.3 km || 
|-id=902 bgcolor=#E9E9E9
| 416902 ||  || — || August 25, 2005 || Palomar || NEAT || — || align=right | 1.3 km || 
|-id=903 bgcolor=#E9E9E9
| 416903 ||  || — || August 28, 2005 || Kitt Peak || Spacewatch || — || align=right | 1.9 km || 
|-id=904 bgcolor=#E9E9E9
| 416904 ||  || — || August 31, 2005 || Kitt Peak || Spacewatch || — || align=right | 1.7 km || 
|-id=905 bgcolor=#E9E9E9
| 416905 ||  || — || August 25, 2005 || Palomar || NEAT || — || align=right | 1.8 km || 
|-id=906 bgcolor=#E9E9E9
| 416906 ||  || — || September 2, 2005 || Palomar || NEAT || JUN || align=right | 1.3 km || 
|-id=907 bgcolor=#E9E9E9
| 416907 ||  || — || September 10, 2005 || Anderson Mesa || LONEOS || — || align=right | 1.5 km || 
|-id=908 bgcolor=#E9E9E9
| 416908 ||  || — || August 31, 2005 || Kitt Peak || Spacewatch || — || align=right | 1.3 km || 
|-id=909 bgcolor=#E9E9E9
| 416909 ||  || — || September 12, 2005 || Anderson Mesa || LONEOS || — || align=right | 2.0 km || 
|-id=910 bgcolor=#E9E9E9
| 416910 ||  || — || September 3, 2005 || Catalina || CSS || — || align=right | 1.7 km || 
|-id=911 bgcolor=#E9E9E9
| 416911 ||  || — || September 13, 2005 || Socorro || LINEAR || — || align=right | 1.7 km || 
|-id=912 bgcolor=#E9E9E9
| 416912 ||  || — || September 14, 2005 || Apache Point || A. C. Becker || — || align=right | 1.4 km || 
|-id=913 bgcolor=#E9E9E9
| 416913 ||  || — || September 14, 2005 || Apache Point || A. C. Becker || — || align=right | 1.2 km || 
|-id=914 bgcolor=#E9E9E9
| 416914 ||  || — || September 1, 2005 || Palomar || NEAT || ADE || align=right | 2.5 km || 
|-id=915 bgcolor=#E9E9E9
| 416915 ||  || — || September 23, 2005 || Kitt Peak || Spacewatch || — || align=right | 1.8 km || 
|-id=916 bgcolor=#E9E9E9
| 416916 ||  || — || September 26, 2005 || Kitt Peak || Spacewatch || — || align=right | 1.7 km || 
|-id=917 bgcolor=#E9E9E9
| 416917 ||  || — || September 23, 2005 || Kitt Peak || Spacewatch || — || align=right | 1.3 km || 
|-id=918 bgcolor=#E9E9E9
| 416918 ||  || — || September 24, 2005 || Kitt Peak || Spacewatch || — || align=right | 1.5 km || 
|-id=919 bgcolor=#E9E9E9
| 416919 ||  || — || September 24, 2005 || Kitt Peak || Spacewatch || — || align=right | 1.3 km || 
|-id=920 bgcolor=#E9E9E9
| 416920 ||  || — || September 24, 2005 || Kitt Peak || Spacewatch || — || align=right data-sort-value="0.84" | 840 m || 
|-id=921 bgcolor=#E9E9E9
| 416921 ||  || — || September 24, 2005 || Kitt Peak || Spacewatch ||  || align=right | 1.3 km || 
|-id=922 bgcolor=#E9E9E9
| 416922 ||  || — || September 24, 2005 || Kitt Peak || Spacewatch || — || align=right | 1.9 km || 
|-id=923 bgcolor=#E9E9E9
| 416923 ||  || — || September 25, 2005 || Kitt Peak || Spacewatch || — || align=right | 1.5 km || 
|-id=924 bgcolor=#E9E9E9
| 416924 ||  || — || September 25, 2005 || Kitt Peak || Spacewatch || — || align=right | 1.5 km || 
|-id=925 bgcolor=#E9E9E9
| 416925 ||  || — || September 26, 2005 || Palomar || NEAT || — || align=right | 1.6 km || 
|-id=926 bgcolor=#E9E9E9
| 416926 ||  || — || September 26, 2005 || Kitt Peak || Spacewatch || — || align=right | 1.1 km || 
|-id=927 bgcolor=#E9E9E9
| 416927 ||  || — || September 23, 2005 || Catalina || CSS || — || align=right | 1.8 km || 
|-id=928 bgcolor=#E9E9E9
| 416928 ||  || — || September 24, 2005 || Kitt Peak || Spacewatch || WIT || align=right data-sort-value="0.90" | 900 m || 
|-id=929 bgcolor=#E9E9E9
| 416929 ||  || — || September 24, 2005 || Kitt Peak || Spacewatch || — || align=right | 1.3 km || 
|-id=930 bgcolor=#E9E9E9
| 416930 ||  || — || September 24, 2005 || Kitt Peak || Spacewatch || — || align=right | 1.9 km || 
|-id=931 bgcolor=#E9E9E9
| 416931 ||  || — || September 24, 2005 || Kitt Peak || Spacewatch || EUN || align=right | 1.3 km || 
|-id=932 bgcolor=#E9E9E9
| 416932 ||  || — || September 24, 2005 || Kitt Peak || Spacewatch || — || align=right | 1.4 km || 
|-id=933 bgcolor=#E9E9E9
| 416933 ||  || — || September 25, 2005 || Palomar || NEAT || JUN || align=right | 1.2 km || 
|-id=934 bgcolor=#E9E9E9
| 416934 ||  || — || September 25, 2005 || Kitt Peak || Spacewatch || — || align=right | 2.2 km || 
|-id=935 bgcolor=#E9E9E9
| 416935 ||  || — || September 26, 2005 || Kitt Peak || Spacewatch || — || align=right | 2.5 km || 
|-id=936 bgcolor=#E9E9E9
| 416936 ||  || — || September 26, 2005 || Palomar || NEAT || — || align=right | 1.4 km || 
|-id=937 bgcolor=#E9E9E9
| 416937 ||  || — || September 27, 2005 || Kitt Peak || Spacewatch || EUN || align=right | 1.1 km || 
|-id=938 bgcolor=#E9E9E9
| 416938 ||  || — || September 28, 2005 || Palomar || NEAT || — || align=right | 1.7 km || 
|-id=939 bgcolor=#E9E9E9
| 416939 ||  || — || September 29, 2005 || Kitt Peak || Spacewatch || — || align=right | 1.4 km || 
|-id=940 bgcolor=#E9E9E9
| 416940 ||  || — || September 23, 2005 || Kitt Peak || Spacewatch || — || align=right | 1.3 km || 
|-id=941 bgcolor=#E9E9E9
| 416941 ||  || — || September 29, 2005 || Catalina || CSS || — || align=right | 2.3 km || 
|-id=942 bgcolor=#E9E9E9
| 416942 ||  || — || September 29, 2005 || Kitt Peak || Spacewatch || — || align=right | 1.5 km || 
|-id=943 bgcolor=#E9E9E9
| 416943 ||  || — || September 24, 2005 || Kitt Peak || Spacewatch || — || align=right | 1.4 km || 
|-id=944 bgcolor=#E9E9E9
| 416944 ||  || — || September 25, 2005 || Kitt Peak || Spacewatch || — || align=right | 1.7 km || 
|-id=945 bgcolor=#E9E9E9
| 416945 ||  || — || September 25, 2005 || Kitt Peak || Spacewatch || — || align=right | 1.6 km || 
|-id=946 bgcolor=#E9E9E9
| 416946 ||  || — || September 25, 2005 || Kitt Peak || Spacewatch || — || align=right | 1.2 km || 
|-id=947 bgcolor=#E9E9E9
| 416947 ||  || — || September 26, 2005 || Palomar || NEAT || MAR || align=right | 1.4 km || 
|-id=948 bgcolor=#E9E9E9
| 416948 ||  || — || September 27, 2005 || Palomar || NEAT || — || align=right | 1.8 km || 
|-id=949 bgcolor=#E9E9E9
| 416949 ||  || — || September 28, 2005 || Palomar || NEAT || — || align=right | 1.9 km || 
|-id=950 bgcolor=#E9E9E9
| 416950 ||  || — || September 29, 2005 || Kitt Peak || Spacewatch || WIT || align=right | 1.1 km || 
|-id=951 bgcolor=#E9E9E9
| 416951 ||  || — || September 29, 2005 || Kitt Peak || Spacewatch || — || align=right | 2.2 km || 
|-id=952 bgcolor=#d6d6d6
| 416952 ||  || — || September 29, 2005 || Mount Lemmon || Mount Lemmon Survey || SHU3:2 || align=right | 5.2 km || 
|-id=953 bgcolor=#E9E9E9
| 416953 ||  || — || September 30, 2005 || Kitt Peak || Spacewatch || — || align=right | 1.2 km || 
|-id=954 bgcolor=#E9E9E9
| 416954 ||  || — || September 30, 2005 || Kitt Peak || Spacewatch || — || align=right | 1.3 km || 
|-id=955 bgcolor=#E9E9E9
| 416955 ||  || — || September 30, 2005 || Palomar || NEAT || — || align=right | 1.3 km || 
|-id=956 bgcolor=#E9E9E9
| 416956 ||  || — || September 30, 2005 || Kitt Peak || Spacewatch || — || align=right | 1.3 km || 
|-id=957 bgcolor=#E9E9E9
| 416957 ||  || — || September 30, 2005 || Mount Lemmon || Mount Lemmon Survey || — || align=right | 1.5 km || 
|-id=958 bgcolor=#E9E9E9
| 416958 ||  || — || September 30, 2005 || Mount Lemmon || Mount Lemmon Survey || — || align=right | 1.4 km || 
|-id=959 bgcolor=#E9E9E9
| 416959 ||  || — || June 11, 2005 || Catalina || CSS || — || align=right | 3.4 km || 
|-id=960 bgcolor=#E9E9E9
| 416960 ||  || — || September 30, 2005 || Anderson Mesa || LONEOS || — || align=right | 2.0 km || 
|-id=961 bgcolor=#E9E9E9
| 416961 ||  || — || September 29, 2005 || Catalina || CSS || — || align=right | 1.4 km || 
|-id=962 bgcolor=#E9E9E9
| 416962 ||  || — || September 30, 2005 || Catalina || CSS || MAR || align=right | 1.5 km || 
|-id=963 bgcolor=#E9E9E9
| 416963 ||  || — || September 30, 2005 || Anderson Mesa || LONEOS || — || align=right | 1.2 km || 
|-id=964 bgcolor=#E9E9E9
| 416964 ||  || — || September 24, 2005 || Palomar || NEAT || — || align=right | 1.4 km || 
|-id=965 bgcolor=#E9E9E9
| 416965 ||  || — || September 30, 2005 || Palomar || NEAT || EUN || align=right | 1.3 km || 
|-id=966 bgcolor=#E9E9E9
| 416966 ||  || — || September 30, 2005 || Mauna Kea || Mauna Kea Obs. || — || align=right | 2.7 km || 
|-id=967 bgcolor=#E9E9E9
| 416967 ||  || — || March 26, 2004 || Kitt Peak || Spacewatch || — || align=right | 1.7 km || 
|-id=968 bgcolor=#E9E9E9
| 416968 ||  || — || October 1, 2005 || Socorro || LINEAR || ADE || align=right | 2.1 km || 
|-id=969 bgcolor=#E9E9E9
| 416969 ||  || — || October 1, 2005 || Mount Lemmon || Mount Lemmon Survey || — || align=right | 1.7 km || 
|-id=970 bgcolor=#E9E9E9
| 416970 ||  || — || September 14, 2005 || Catalina || CSS || — || align=right | 1.6 km || 
|-id=971 bgcolor=#E9E9E9
| 416971 ||  || — || October 1, 2005 || Kitt Peak || Spacewatch || — || align=right | 1.3 km || 
|-id=972 bgcolor=#E9E9E9
| 416972 ||  || — || October 1, 2005 || Mount Lemmon || Mount Lemmon Survey || JUN || align=right | 1.1 km || 
|-id=973 bgcolor=#E9E9E9
| 416973 ||  || — || October 1, 2005 || Kitt Peak || Spacewatch || (5) || align=right data-sort-value="0.81" | 810 m || 
|-id=974 bgcolor=#E9E9E9
| 416974 ||  || — || October 2, 2005 || Palomar || NEAT || EUN || align=right | 1.1 km || 
|-id=975 bgcolor=#E9E9E9
| 416975 ||  || — || October 1, 2005 || Mount Lemmon || Mount Lemmon Survey ||  || align=right | 1.1 km || 
|-id=976 bgcolor=#E9E9E9
| 416976 ||  || — || October 3, 2005 || Kitt Peak || Spacewatch || — || align=right | 1.4 km || 
|-id=977 bgcolor=#E9E9E9
| 416977 ||  || — || October 6, 2005 || Catalina || CSS || MAR || align=right | 1.2 km || 
|-id=978 bgcolor=#E9E9E9
| 416978 ||  || — || October 1, 2005 || Mount Lemmon || Mount Lemmon Survey || — || align=right | 2.6 km || 
|-id=979 bgcolor=#E9E9E9
| 416979 ||  || — || October 1, 2005 || Mount Lemmon || Mount Lemmon Survey || — || align=right | 1.7 km || 
|-id=980 bgcolor=#E9E9E9
| 416980 ||  || — || October 6, 2005 || Anderson Mesa || LONEOS || — || align=right | 1.3 km || 
|-id=981 bgcolor=#E9E9E9
| 416981 ||  || — || October 3, 2005 || Socorro || LINEAR || — || align=right | 2.8 km || 
|-id=982 bgcolor=#E9E9E9
| 416982 ||  || — || September 24, 2005 || Kitt Peak || Spacewatch || — || align=right | 1.4 km || 
|-id=983 bgcolor=#E9E9E9
| 416983 ||  || — || October 5, 2005 || Catalina || CSS || — || align=right | 1.3 km || 
|-id=984 bgcolor=#E9E9E9
| 416984 ||  || — || October 6, 2005 || Kitt Peak || Spacewatch || — || align=right | 1.3 km || 
|-id=985 bgcolor=#E9E9E9
| 416985 ||  || — || September 29, 2005 || Mount Lemmon || Mount Lemmon Survey || NEM || align=right | 1.9 km || 
|-id=986 bgcolor=#E9E9E9
| 416986 ||  || — || October 5, 2005 || Kitt Peak || Spacewatch || — || align=right | 3.0 km || 
|-id=987 bgcolor=#E9E9E9
| 416987 ||  || — || September 30, 2005 || Mount Lemmon || Mount Lemmon Survey || — || align=right | 2.2 km || 
|-id=988 bgcolor=#E9E9E9
| 416988 ||  || — || September 29, 2005 || Mount Lemmon || Mount Lemmon Survey || — || align=right | 2.4 km || 
|-id=989 bgcolor=#E9E9E9
| 416989 ||  || — || October 8, 2005 || Kitt Peak || Spacewatch || — || align=right | 1.2 km || 
|-id=990 bgcolor=#E9E9E9
| 416990 ||  || — || October 8, 2005 || Kitt Peak || Spacewatch || — || align=right | 2.0 km || 
|-id=991 bgcolor=#E9E9E9
| 416991 ||  || — || October 8, 2005 || Kitt Peak || Spacewatch || — || align=right | 1.8 km || 
|-id=992 bgcolor=#E9E9E9
| 416992 ||  || — || September 29, 2005 || Kitt Peak || Spacewatch || — || align=right | 2.0 km || 
|-id=993 bgcolor=#E9E9E9
| 416993 ||  || — || October 11, 2005 || Kitt Peak || Spacewatch || — || align=right | 2.3 km || 
|-id=994 bgcolor=#E9E9E9
| 416994 ||  || — || September 29, 2005 || Kitt Peak || Spacewatch || — || align=right | 1.7 km || 
|-id=995 bgcolor=#E9E9E9
| 416995 ||  || — || October 9, 2005 || Kitt Peak || Spacewatch || — || align=right | 1.3 km || 
|-id=996 bgcolor=#E9E9E9
| 416996 ||  || — || September 24, 2005 || Kitt Peak || Spacewatch || — || align=right | 1.3 km || 
|-id=997 bgcolor=#E9E9E9
| 416997 ||  || — || October 9, 2005 || Kitt Peak || Spacewatch || — || align=right | 1.6 km || 
|-id=998 bgcolor=#E9E9E9
| 416998 ||  || — || October 9, 2005 || Kitt Peak || Spacewatch || — || align=right | 1.6 km || 
|-id=999 bgcolor=#E9E9E9
| 416999 ||  || — || October 9, 2005 || Kitt Peak || Spacewatch || MIS || align=right | 2.3 km || 
|-id=000 bgcolor=#E9E9E9
| 417000 ||  || — || October 2, 2005 || Palomar || NEAT || — || align=right | 1.3 km || 
|}

References

External links 
 Discovery Circumstances: Numbered Minor Planets (415001)–(420000) (IAU Minor Planet Center)

0416